

220001–220100 

|-bgcolor=#fefefe
| 220001 ||  || — || August 6, 2002 || Palomar || NEAT || — || align=right data-sort-value="0.94" | 940 m || 
|-id=002 bgcolor=#fefefe
| 220002 ||  || — || August 5, 2002 || Socorro || LINEAR || — || align=right | 1.4 km || 
|-id=003 bgcolor=#FA8072
| 220003 ||  || — || August 5, 2002 || Socorro || LINEAR || — || align=right | 1.5 km || 
|-id=004 bgcolor=#fefefe
| 220004 ||  || — || August 9, 2002 || Socorro || LINEAR || — || align=right | 1.3 km || 
|-id=005 bgcolor=#fefefe
| 220005 ||  || — || August 10, 2002 || Socorro || LINEAR || — || align=right | 1.8 km || 
|-id=006 bgcolor=#FA8072
| 220006 ||  || — || August 14, 2002 || Socorro || LINEAR || — || align=right | 1.8 km || 
|-id=007 bgcolor=#fefefe
| 220007 ||  || — || August 14, 2002 || Socorro || LINEAR || — || align=right | 1.1 km || 
|-id=008 bgcolor=#fefefe
| 220008 ||  || — || August 12, 2002 || Socorro || LINEAR || — || align=right | 1.1 km || 
|-id=009 bgcolor=#fefefe
| 220009 ||  || — || August 12, 2002 || Socorro || LINEAR || PHO || align=right | 2.2 km || 
|-id=010 bgcolor=#fefefe
| 220010 ||  || — || August 14, 2002 || Palomar || NEAT || FLO || align=right | 1.0 km || 
|-id=011 bgcolor=#d6d6d6
| 220011 ||  || — || August 15, 2002 || Palomar || NEAT || — || align=right | 6.1 km || 
|-id=012 bgcolor=#fefefe
| 220012 ||  || — || August 13, 2002 || Anderson Mesa || LONEOS || — || align=right | 1.1 km || 
|-id=013 bgcolor=#fefefe
| 220013 ||  || — || August 14, 2002 || Socorro || LINEAR || NYS || align=right data-sort-value="0.77" | 770 m || 
|-id=014 bgcolor=#fefefe
| 220014 ||  || — || August 15, 2002 || Anderson Mesa || LONEOS || — || align=right data-sort-value="0.90" | 900 m || 
|-id=015 bgcolor=#fefefe
| 220015 ||  || — || August 8, 2002 || Palomar || S. F. Hönig || — || align=right | 1.1 km || 
|-id=016 bgcolor=#d6d6d6
| 220016 ||  || — || August 14, 2002 || Palomar || NEAT || — || align=right | 6.0 km || 
|-id=017 bgcolor=#fefefe
| 220017 ||  || — || August 14, 2002 || Palomar || NEAT || PHO || align=right | 1.4 km || 
|-id=018 bgcolor=#fefefe
| 220018 ||  || — || August 17, 2002 || Socorro || LINEAR || — || align=right | 3.6 km || 
|-id=019 bgcolor=#fefefe
| 220019 ||  || — || August 24, 2002 || Palomar || NEAT || FLO || align=right | 1.8 km || 
|-id=020 bgcolor=#fefefe
| 220020 ||  || — || August 26, 2002 || Palomar || NEAT || — || align=right | 1.1 km || 
|-id=021 bgcolor=#FA8072
| 220021 ||  || — || August 28, 2002 || Socorro || LINEAR || — || align=right | 1.6 km || 
|-id=022 bgcolor=#fefefe
| 220022 ||  || — || August 28, 2002 || Palomar || NEAT || V || align=right data-sort-value="0.84" | 840 m || 
|-id=023 bgcolor=#fefefe
| 220023 ||  || — || August 30, 2002 || Palomar || NEAT || — || align=right | 1.2 km || 
|-id=024 bgcolor=#fefefe
| 220024 ||  || — || August 30, 2002 || Anderson Mesa || LONEOS || — || align=right | 1.4 km || 
|-id=025 bgcolor=#fefefe
| 220025 ||  || — || August 28, 2002 || Palomar || R. Matson || — || align=right data-sort-value="0.91" | 910 m || 
|-id=026 bgcolor=#fefefe
| 220026 ||  || — || August 17, 2002 || Palomar || A. Lowe || NYS || align=right data-sort-value="0.93" | 930 m || 
|-id=027 bgcolor=#fefefe
| 220027 ||  || — || August 17, 2002 || Palomar || A. Lowe || — || align=right data-sort-value="0.99" | 990 m || 
|-id=028 bgcolor=#fefefe
| 220028 ||  || — || August 30, 2002 || Palomar || NEAT || — || align=right data-sort-value="0.96" | 960 m || 
|-id=029 bgcolor=#fefefe
| 220029 ||  || — || August 18, 2002 || Palomar || NEAT || — || align=right data-sort-value="0.93" | 930 m || 
|-id=030 bgcolor=#fefefe
| 220030 ||  || — || August 29, 2002 || Palomar || NEAT || — || align=right | 1.1 km || 
|-id=031 bgcolor=#fefefe
| 220031 ||  || — || August 17, 2002 || Palomar || NEAT || — || align=right data-sort-value="0.86" | 860 m || 
|-id=032 bgcolor=#fefefe
| 220032 ||  || — || August 17, 2002 || Palomar || NEAT || NYS || align=right data-sort-value="0.59" | 590 m || 
|-id=033 bgcolor=#fefefe
| 220033 ||  || — || August 29, 2002 || Palomar || NEAT || — || align=right data-sort-value="0.76" | 760 m || 
|-id=034 bgcolor=#fefefe
| 220034 ||  || — || September 4, 2002 || Anderson Mesa || LONEOS || FLO || align=right data-sort-value="0.88" | 880 m || 
|-id=035 bgcolor=#fefefe
| 220035 ||  || — || September 1, 2002 || Haleakala || NEAT || fast? || align=right data-sort-value="0.98" | 980 m || 
|-id=036 bgcolor=#fefefe
| 220036 ||  || — || September 4, 2002 || Palomar || NEAT || — || align=right | 1.2 km || 
|-id=037 bgcolor=#fefefe
| 220037 ||  || — || September 5, 2002 || Anderson Mesa || LONEOS || V || align=right | 1.0 km || 
|-id=038 bgcolor=#FA8072
| 220038 ||  || — || September 5, 2002 || Socorro || LINEAR || — || align=right data-sort-value="0.92" | 920 m || 
|-id=039 bgcolor=#fefefe
| 220039 ||  || — || September 5, 2002 || Socorro || LINEAR || — || align=right | 1.1 km || 
|-id=040 bgcolor=#fefefe
| 220040 ||  || — || September 5, 2002 || Anderson Mesa || LONEOS || FLO || align=right data-sort-value="0.93" | 930 m || 
|-id=041 bgcolor=#fefefe
| 220041 ||  || — || September 5, 2002 || Anderson Mesa || LONEOS || — || align=right | 1.1 km || 
|-id=042 bgcolor=#fefefe
| 220042 ||  || — || September 3, 2002 || Palomar || NEAT || FLO || align=right | 1.2 km || 
|-id=043 bgcolor=#fefefe
| 220043 ||  || — || September 4, 2002 || Anderson Mesa || LONEOS || FLO || align=right | 1.0 km || 
|-id=044 bgcolor=#fefefe
| 220044 ||  || — || September 4, 2002 || Palomar || NEAT || — || align=right | 1.5 km || 
|-id=045 bgcolor=#fefefe
| 220045 ||  || — || September 5, 2002 || Socorro || LINEAR || V || align=right | 1.0 km || 
|-id=046 bgcolor=#fefefe
| 220046 ||  || — || September 5, 2002 || Socorro || LINEAR || — || align=right | 1.1 km || 
|-id=047 bgcolor=#fefefe
| 220047 ||  || — || September 5, 2002 || Socorro || LINEAR || NYS || align=right | 2.3 km || 
|-id=048 bgcolor=#fefefe
| 220048 ||  || — || September 5, 2002 || Socorro || LINEAR || V || align=right | 1.0 km || 
|-id=049 bgcolor=#fefefe
| 220049 ||  || — || September 5, 2002 || Socorro || LINEAR || ERI || align=right | 2.1 km || 
|-id=050 bgcolor=#fefefe
| 220050 ||  || — || September 5, 2002 || Anderson Mesa || LONEOS || — || align=right | 1.2 km || 
|-id=051 bgcolor=#fefefe
| 220051 ||  || — || September 5, 2002 || Socorro || LINEAR || ERI || align=right | 2.4 km || 
|-id=052 bgcolor=#fefefe
| 220052 ||  || — || September 5, 2002 || Socorro || LINEAR || — || align=right | 1.3 km || 
|-id=053 bgcolor=#fefefe
| 220053 ||  || — || September 5, 2002 || Socorro || LINEAR || V || align=right | 1.3 km || 
|-id=054 bgcolor=#fefefe
| 220054 ||  || — || September 6, 2002 || Socorro || LINEAR || — || align=right data-sort-value="0.79" | 790 m || 
|-id=055 bgcolor=#fefefe
| 220055 ||  || — || September 6, 2002 || Socorro || LINEAR || V || align=right data-sort-value="0.95" | 950 m || 
|-id=056 bgcolor=#fefefe
| 220056 ||  || — || September 5, 2002 || Socorro || LINEAR || FLO || align=right data-sort-value="0.73" | 730 m || 
|-id=057 bgcolor=#fefefe
| 220057 ||  || — || September 5, 2002 || Socorro || LINEAR || — || align=right | 1.2 km || 
|-id=058 bgcolor=#fefefe
| 220058 ||  || — || September 7, 2002 || Socorro || LINEAR || FLO || align=right | 1.4 km || 
|-id=059 bgcolor=#fefefe
| 220059 ||  || — || September 8, 2002 || Haleakala || NEAT || V || align=right data-sort-value="0.84" | 840 m || 
|-id=060 bgcolor=#fefefe
| 220060 ||  || — || September 11, 2002 || Haleakala || NEAT || — || align=right | 1.3 km || 
|-id=061 bgcolor=#fefefe
| 220061 ||  || — || September 10, 2002 || Palomar || NEAT || FLO || align=right | 1.1 km || 
|-id=062 bgcolor=#fefefe
| 220062 ||  || — || September 11, 2002 || Palomar || NEAT || — || align=right data-sort-value="0.87" | 870 m || 
|-id=063 bgcolor=#fefefe
| 220063 ||  || — || September 11, 2002 || Palomar || NEAT || — || align=right | 1.1 km || 
|-id=064 bgcolor=#fefefe
| 220064 ||  || — || September 11, 2002 || Palomar || NEAT || — || align=right | 1.1 km || 
|-id=065 bgcolor=#fefefe
| 220065 ||  || — || September 12, 2002 || Palomar || NEAT || — || align=right data-sort-value="0.98" | 980 m || 
|-id=066 bgcolor=#fefefe
| 220066 ||  || — || September 12, 2002 || Palomar || NEAT || V || align=right data-sort-value="0.92" | 920 m || 
|-id=067 bgcolor=#fefefe
| 220067 ||  || — || September 12, 2002 || Palomar || NEAT || V || align=right | 1.3 km || 
|-id=068 bgcolor=#fefefe
| 220068 ||  || — || September 10, 2002 || Haleakala || NEAT || — || align=right | 1.2 km || 
|-id=069 bgcolor=#fefefe
| 220069 ||  || — || September 11, 2002 || Palomar || NEAT || — || align=right | 1.1 km || 
|-id=070 bgcolor=#fefefe
| 220070 ||  || — || September 12, 2002 || Palomar || NEAT || — || align=right | 1.0 km || 
|-id=071 bgcolor=#fefefe
| 220071 ||  || — || September 12, 2002 || Palomar || NEAT || NYS || align=right data-sort-value="0.82" | 820 m || 
|-id=072 bgcolor=#fefefe
| 220072 ||  || — || September 13, 2002 || Palomar || NEAT || — || align=right data-sort-value="0.87" | 870 m || 
|-id=073 bgcolor=#fefefe
| 220073 ||  || — || September 13, 2002 || Palomar || NEAT || FLO || align=right data-sort-value="0.79" | 790 m || 
|-id=074 bgcolor=#fefefe
| 220074 ||  || — || September 12, 2002 || Palomar || NEAT || — || align=right | 1.2 km || 
|-id=075 bgcolor=#d6d6d6
| 220075 ||  || — || September 13, 2002 || Socorro || LINEAR || — || align=right | 3.3 km || 
|-id=076 bgcolor=#fefefe
| 220076 ||  || — || September 14, 2002 || Palomar || NEAT || — || align=right | 1.1 km || 
|-id=077 bgcolor=#fefefe
| 220077 ||  || — || September 14, 2002 || Palomar || NEAT || V || align=right data-sort-value="0.81" | 810 m || 
|-id=078 bgcolor=#fefefe
| 220078 ||  || — || September 15, 2002 || Haleakala || NEAT || — || align=right | 1.4 km || 
|-id=079 bgcolor=#fefefe
| 220079 ||  || — || September 13, 2002 || Socorro || LINEAR || — || align=right | 1.1 km || 
|-id=080 bgcolor=#fefefe
| 220080 ||  || — || September 15, 2002 || Haleakala || NEAT || NYS || align=right data-sort-value="0.90" | 900 m || 
|-id=081 bgcolor=#fefefe
| 220081 ||  || — || September 14, 2002 || Haleakala || NEAT || — || align=right | 1.0 km || 
|-id=082 bgcolor=#fefefe
| 220082 ||  || — || September 14, 2002 || Palomar || NEAT || — || align=right data-sort-value="0.94" | 940 m || 
|-id=083 bgcolor=#fefefe
| 220083 ||  || — || September 4, 2002 || Palomar || NEAT || FLO || align=right data-sort-value="0.84" | 840 m || 
|-id=084 bgcolor=#fefefe
| 220084 ||  || — || September 26, 2002 || Palomar || NEAT || — || align=right data-sort-value="0.93" | 930 m || 
|-id=085 bgcolor=#fefefe
| 220085 ||  || — || September 27, 2002 || Palomar || NEAT || V || align=right | 1.1 km || 
|-id=086 bgcolor=#fefefe
| 220086 ||  || — || September 27, 2002 || Palomar || NEAT || FLO || align=right | 1.3 km || 
|-id=087 bgcolor=#fefefe
| 220087 ||  || — || September 27, 2002 || Palomar || NEAT || NYS || align=right data-sort-value="0.79" | 790 m || 
|-id=088 bgcolor=#d6d6d6
| 220088 ||  || — || September 27, 2002 || Palomar || NEAT || — || align=right | 5.0 km || 
|-id=089 bgcolor=#fefefe
| 220089 ||  || — || September 26, 2002 || Palomar || NEAT || — || align=right data-sort-value="0.96" | 960 m || 
|-id=090 bgcolor=#fefefe
| 220090 ||  || — || September 28, 2002 || Haleakala || NEAT || — || align=right | 1.3 km || 
|-id=091 bgcolor=#FA8072
| 220091 ||  || — || September 28, 2002 || Haleakala || NEAT || — || align=right | 1.2 km || 
|-id=092 bgcolor=#fefefe
| 220092 ||  || — || September 29, 2002 || Haleakala || NEAT || — || align=right data-sort-value="0.97" | 970 m || 
|-id=093 bgcolor=#fefefe
| 220093 ||  || — || September 30, 2002 || Socorro || LINEAR || — || align=right | 1.4 km || 
|-id=094 bgcolor=#fefefe
| 220094 ||  || — || September 30, 2002 || Haleakala || NEAT || V || align=right | 1.1 km || 
|-id=095 bgcolor=#FA8072
| 220095 ||  || — || September 28, 2002 || Haleakala || NEAT || — || align=right data-sort-value="0.73" | 730 m || 
|-id=096 bgcolor=#fefefe
| 220096 ||  || — || September 28, 2002 || Haleakala || NEAT || NYS || align=right data-sort-value="0.80" | 800 m || 
|-id=097 bgcolor=#fefefe
| 220097 ||  || — || September 29, 2002 || Kitt Peak || Spacewatch || NYS || align=right data-sort-value="0.73" | 730 m || 
|-id=098 bgcolor=#fefefe
| 220098 ||  || — || September 30, 2002 || Socorro || LINEAR || NYS || align=right data-sort-value="0.94" | 940 m || 
|-id=099 bgcolor=#fefefe
| 220099 ||  || — || September 30, 2002 || Socorro || LINEAR || V || align=right | 1.2 km || 
|-id=100 bgcolor=#fefefe
| 220100 ||  || — || September 30, 2002 || Haleakala || NEAT || — || align=right | 1.1 km || 
|}

220101–220200 

|-bgcolor=#fefefe
| 220101 ||  || — || September 30, 2002 || Haleakala || NEAT || — || align=right | 1.1 km || 
|-id=102 bgcolor=#fefefe
| 220102 ||  || — || September 16, 2002 || Palomar || NEAT || — || align=right | 1.1 km || 
|-id=103 bgcolor=#fefefe
| 220103 ||  || — || October 1, 2002 || Haleakala || NEAT || V || align=right | 1.2 km || 
|-id=104 bgcolor=#fefefe
| 220104 ||  || — || October 2, 2002 || Socorro || LINEAR || — || align=right data-sort-value="0.97" | 970 m || 
|-id=105 bgcolor=#fefefe
| 220105 ||  || — || October 2, 2002 || Socorro || LINEAR || — || align=right | 2.3 km || 
|-id=106 bgcolor=#fefefe
| 220106 ||  || — || October 2, 2002 || Socorro || LINEAR || — || align=right | 1.2 km || 
|-id=107 bgcolor=#fefefe
| 220107 ||  || — || October 2, 2002 || Socorro || LINEAR || — || align=right | 1.2 km || 
|-id=108 bgcolor=#fefefe
| 220108 ||  || — || October 2, 2002 || Socorro || LINEAR || — || align=right | 1.4 km || 
|-id=109 bgcolor=#fefefe
| 220109 ||  || — || October 2, 2002 || Socorro || LINEAR || NYS || align=right data-sort-value="0.83" | 830 m || 
|-id=110 bgcolor=#fefefe
| 220110 ||  || — || October 2, 2002 || Socorro || LINEAR || — || align=right | 1.3 km || 
|-id=111 bgcolor=#fefefe
| 220111 ||  || — || October 2, 2002 || Socorro || LINEAR || — || align=right | 1.4 km || 
|-id=112 bgcolor=#fefefe
| 220112 ||  || — || October 2, 2002 || Socorro || LINEAR || — || align=right | 1.2 km || 
|-id=113 bgcolor=#fefefe
| 220113 ||  || — || October 2, 2002 || Socorro || LINEAR || NYS || align=right data-sort-value="0.80" | 800 m || 
|-id=114 bgcolor=#fefefe
| 220114 ||  || — || October 2, 2002 || Socorro || LINEAR || V || align=right | 1.2 km || 
|-id=115 bgcolor=#fefefe
| 220115 ||  || — || October 2, 2002 || Socorro || LINEAR || — || align=right | 1.3 km || 
|-id=116 bgcolor=#fefefe
| 220116 ||  || — || October 2, 2002 || Socorro || LINEAR || V || align=right | 1.0 km || 
|-id=117 bgcolor=#fefefe
| 220117 ||  || — || October 2, 2002 || Socorro || LINEAR || — || align=right | 1.4 km || 
|-id=118 bgcolor=#fefefe
| 220118 ||  || — || October 2, 2002 || Socorro || LINEAR || ERI || align=right | 2.2 km || 
|-id=119 bgcolor=#fefefe
| 220119 ||  || — || October 2, 2002 || Socorro || LINEAR || V || align=right | 1.2 km || 
|-id=120 bgcolor=#fefefe
| 220120 ||  || — || October 2, 2002 || Socorro || LINEAR || — || align=right | 1.1 km || 
|-id=121 bgcolor=#fefefe
| 220121 ||  || — || October 2, 2002 || Socorro || LINEAR || — || align=right | 1.7 km || 
|-id=122 bgcolor=#fefefe
| 220122 ||  || — || October 1, 2002 || Anderson Mesa || LONEOS || FLO || align=right data-sort-value="0.93" | 930 m || 
|-id=123 bgcolor=#fefefe
| 220123 ||  || — || October 5, 2002 || Socorro || LINEAR || PHO || align=right | 2.2 km || 
|-id=124 bgcolor=#FFC2E0
| 220124 ||  || — || October 5, 2002 || Socorro || LINEAR || APO || align=right data-sort-value="0.61" | 610 m || 
|-id=125 bgcolor=#fefefe
| 220125 ||  || — || October 6, 2002 || Socorro || LINEAR || PHO || align=right | 1.4 km || 
|-id=126 bgcolor=#fefefe
| 220126 ||  || — || October 3, 2002 || Palomar || NEAT || — || align=right | 1.2 km || 
|-id=127 bgcolor=#fefefe
| 220127 ||  || — || October 1, 2002 || Anderson Mesa || LONEOS || NYS || align=right data-sort-value="0.91" | 910 m || 
|-id=128 bgcolor=#fefefe
| 220128 ||  || — || October 1, 2002 || Anderson Mesa || LONEOS || — || align=right | 1.7 km || 
|-id=129 bgcolor=#fefefe
| 220129 ||  || — || October 1, 2002 || Anderson Mesa || LONEOS || NYS || align=right data-sort-value="0.94" | 940 m || 
|-id=130 bgcolor=#fefefe
| 220130 ||  || — || October 1, 2002 || Anderson Mesa || LONEOS || — || align=right data-sort-value="0.94" | 940 m || 
|-id=131 bgcolor=#fefefe
| 220131 ||  || — || October 1, 2002 || Socorro || LINEAR || FLO || align=right | 1.3 km || 
|-id=132 bgcolor=#fefefe
| 220132 ||  || — || October 3, 2002 || Socorro || LINEAR || — || align=right | 1.3 km || 
|-id=133 bgcolor=#fefefe
| 220133 ||  || — || October 3, 2002 || Palomar || NEAT || V || align=right | 1.1 km || 
|-id=134 bgcolor=#fefefe
| 220134 ||  || — || October 3, 2002 || Socorro || LINEAR || — || align=right data-sort-value="0.93" | 930 m || 
|-id=135 bgcolor=#fefefe
| 220135 ||  || — || October 4, 2002 || Socorro || LINEAR || FLO || align=right | 1.2 km || 
|-id=136 bgcolor=#fefefe
| 220136 ||  || — || October 4, 2002 || Socorro || LINEAR || — || align=right | 1.4 km || 
|-id=137 bgcolor=#fefefe
| 220137 ||  || — || October 3, 2002 || Socorro || LINEAR || — || align=right | 1.2 km || 
|-id=138 bgcolor=#fefefe
| 220138 ||  || — || October 3, 2002 || Palomar || NEAT || V || align=right | 1.3 km || 
|-id=139 bgcolor=#fefefe
| 220139 ||  || — || October 3, 2002 || Palomar || NEAT || V || align=right data-sort-value="0.94" | 940 m || 
|-id=140 bgcolor=#fefefe
| 220140 ||  || — || October 4, 2002 || Palomar || NEAT || V || align=right | 1.1 km || 
|-id=141 bgcolor=#fefefe
| 220141 ||  || — || October 4, 2002 || Palomar || NEAT || V || align=right | 1.1 km || 
|-id=142 bgcolor=#fefefe
| 220142 ||  || — || October 4, 2002 || Socorro || LINEAR || — || align=right | 1.0 km || 
|-id=143 bgcolor=#fefefe
| 220143 ||  || — || October 4, 2002 || Palomar || NEAT || V || align=right | 1.1 km || 
|-id=144 bgcolor=#fefefe
| 220144 ||  || — || October 4, 2002 || Palomar || NEAT || V || align=right | 1.1 km || 
|-id=145 bgcolor=#fefefe
| 220145 ||  || — || October 4, 2002 || Palomar || NEAT || — || align=right data-sort-value="0.91" | 910 m || 
|-id=146 bgcolor=#fefefe
| 220146 ||  || — || October 5, 2002 || Palomar || NEAT || V || align=right data-sort-value="0.77" | 770 m || 
|-id=147 bgcolor=#fefefe
| 220147 ||  || — || October 5, 2002 || Palomar || NEAT || — || align=right | 1.6 km || 
|-id=148 bgcolor=#fefefe
| 220148 ||  || — || October 3, 2002 || Palomar || NEAT || — || align=right | 2.8 km || 
|-id=149 bgcolor=#d6d6d6
| 220149 ||  || — || October 3, 2002 || Palomar || NEAT || 7:4 || align=right | 8.2 km || 
|-id=150 bgcolor=#fefefe
| 220150 ||  || — || October 4, 2002 || Socorro || LINEAR || NYS || align=right data-sort-value="0.84" | 840 m || 
|-id=151 bgcolor=#fefefe
| 220151 ||  || — || October 4, 2002 || Socorro || LINEAR || V || align=right | 1.3 km || 
|-id=152 bgcolor=#fefefe
| 220152 ||  || — || October 4, 2002 || Socorro || LINEAR || FLO || align=right | 1.0 km || 
|-id=153 bgcolor=#fefefe
| 220153 ||  || — || October 4, 2002 || Socorro || LINEAR || V || align=right | 1.1 km || 
|-id=154 bgcolor=#fefefe
| 220154 ||  || — || October 4, 2002 || Socorro || LINEAR || ERI || align=right | 2.2 km || 
|-id=155 bgcolor=#fefefe
| 220155 ||  || — || October 5, 2002 || Socorro || LINEAR || — || align=right | 1.2 km || 
|-id=156 bgcolor=#fefefe
| 220156 ||  || — || October 6, 2002 || Socorro || LINEAR || — || align=right | 1.3 km || 
|-id=157 bgcolor=#fefefe
| 220157 ||  || — || October 6, 2002 || Haleakala || NEAT || FLO || align=right data-sort-value="0.99" | 990 m || 
|-id=158 bgcolor=#fefefe
| 220158 ||  || — || October 9, 2002 || Kitt Peak || Spacewatch || — || align=right | 1.2 km || 
|-id=159 bgcolor=#FA8072
| 220159 ||  || — || October 10, 2002 || Socorro || LINEAR || — || align=right data-sort-value="0.96" | 960 m || 
|-id=160 bgcolor=#fefefe
| 220160 ||  || — || October 7, 2002 || Socorro || LINEAR || V || align=right data-sort-value="0.99" | 990 m || 
|-id=161 bgcolor=#fefefe
| 220161 ||  || — || October 8, 2002 || Anderson Mesa || LONEOS || — || align=right | 1.3 km || 
|-id=162 bgcolor=#fefefe
| 220162 ||  || — || October 9, 2002 || Anderson Mesa || LONEOS || — || align=right | 1.1 km || 
|-id=163 bgcolor=#fefefe
| 220163 ||  || — || October 9, 2002 || Socorro || LINEAR || NYS || align=right data-sort-value="0.79" | 790 m || 
|-id=164 bgcolor=#fefefe
| 220164 ||  || — || October 9, 2002 || Socorro || LINEAR || — || align=right data-sort-value="0.75" | 750 m || 
|-id=165 bgcolor=#fefefe
| 220165 ||  || — || October 9, 2002 || Socorro || LINEAR || — || align=right | 1.7 km || 
|-id=166 bgcolor=#fefefe
| 220166 ||  || — || October 9, 2002 || Socorro || LINEAR || V || align=right | 1.1 km || 
|-id=167 bgcolor=#fefefe
| 220167 ||  || — || October 10, 2002 || Socorro || LINEAR || — || align=right | 1.4 km || 
|-id=168 bgcolor=#fefefe
| 220168 ||  || — || October 10, 2002 || Socorro || LINEAR || — || align=right | 1.4 km || 
|-id=169 bgcolor=#FA8072
| 220169 ||  || — || October 10, 2002 || Socorro || LINEAR || — || align=right data-sort-value="0.98" | 980 m || 
|-id=170 bgcolor=#fefefe
| 220170 ||  || — || October 10, 2002 || Socorro || LINEAR || — || align=right | 1.6 km || 
|-id=171 bgcolor=#fefefe
| 220171 ||  || — || October 10, 2002 || Socorro || LINEAR || — || align=right | 1.3 km || 
|-id=172 bgcolor=#fefefe
| 220172 ||  || — || October 12, 2002 || Socorro || LINEAR || FLO || align=right | 1.1 km || 
|-id=173 bgcolor=#fefefe
| 220173 ||  || — || October 4, 2002 || Socorro || LINEAR || V || align=right | 1.3 km || 
|-id=174 bgcolor=#fefefe
| 220174 ||  || — || October 5, 2002 || Apache Point || SDSS || — || align=right data-sort-value="0.96" | 960 m || 
|-id=175 bgcolor=#fefefe
| 220175 ||  || — || October 5, 2002 || Apache Point || SDSS || — || align=right data-sort-value="0.90" | 900 m || 
|-id=176 bgcolor=#fefefe
| 220176 ||  || — || October 15, 2002 || Palomar || NEAT || V || align=right data-sort-value="0.90" | 900 m || 
|-id=177 bgcolor=#E9E9E9
| 220177 ||  || — || October 28, 2002 || Palomar || NEAT || — || align=right | 3.5 km || 
|-id=178 bgcolor=#fefefe
| 220178 ||  || — || October 28, 2002 || Palomar || NEAT || V || align=right | 1.1 km || 
|-id=179 bgcolor=#fefefe
| 220179 ||  || — || October 28, 2002 || Haleakala || NEAT || NYS || align=right | 1.0 km || 
|-id=180 bgcolor=#fefefe
| 220180 ||  || — || October 29, 2002 || Palomar || NEAT || PHO || align=right | 2.4 km || 
|-id=181 bgcolor=#fefefe
| 220181 ||  || — || October 28, 2002 || Haleakala || NEAT || — || align=right | 1.7 km || 
|-id=182 bgcolor=#fefefe
| 220182 ||  || — || October 31, 2002 || Anderson Mesa || LONEOS || — || align=right | 1.1 km || 
|-id=183 bgcolor=#d6d6d6
| 220183 ||  || — || October 31, 2002 || Palomar || NEAT || HYG || align=right | 5.4 km || 
|-id=184 bgcolor=#fefefe
| 220184 ||  || — || October 29, 2002 || Apache Point || SDSS || — || align=right | 1.1 km || 
|-id=185 bgcolor=#E9E9E9
| 220185 ||  || — || October 29, 2002 || Apache Point || SDSS || — || align=right | 2.6 km || 
|-id=186 bgcolor=#fefefe
| 220186 ||  || — || October 29, 2002 || Palomar || NEAT || NYS || align=right data-sort-value="0.78" | 780 m || 
|-id=187 bgcolor=#fefefe
| 220187 ||  || — || October 30, 2002 || Palomar || NEAT || — || align=right | 1.3 km || 
|-id=188 bgcolor=#fefefe
| 220188 ||  || — || November 1, 2002 || Palomar || NEAT || NYS || align=right | 1.2 km || 
|-id=189 bgcolor=#fefefe
| 220189 ||  || — || November 4, 2002 || Palomar || NEAT || — || align=right data-sort-value="0.97" | 970 m || 
|-id=190 bgcolor=#fefefe
| 220190 ||  || — || November 1, 2002 || Palomar || NEAT || — || align=right | 1.3 km || 
|-id=191 bgcolor=#d6d6d6
| 220191 ||  || — || November 1, 2002 || Palomar || NEAT || EOS || align=right | 3.1 km || 
|-id=192 bgcolor=#fefefe
| 220192 ||  || — || November 1, 2002 || Palomar || NEAT || NYS || align=right | 1.0 km || 
|-id=193 bgcolor=#fefefe
| 220193 ||  || — || November 5, 2002 || Socorro || LINEAR || — || align=right | 1.2 km || 
|-id=194 bgcolor=#fefefe
| 220194 ||  || — || November 5, 2002 || Socorro || LINEAR || ERI || align=right | 2.8 km || 
|-id=195 bgcolor=#fefefe
| 220195 ||  || — || November 4, 2002 || Haleakala || NEAT || V || align=right | 1.1 km || 
|-id=196 bgcolor=#fefefe
| 220196 ||  || — || November 4, 2002 || Haleakala || NEAT || — || align=right | 1.4 km || 
|-id=197 bgcolor=#fefefe
| 220197 ||  || — || November 5, 2002 || Socorro || LINEAR || — || align=right | 1.5 km || 
|-id=198 bgcolor=#fefefe
| 220198 ||  || — || November 5, 2002 || Socorro || LINEAR || NYS || align=right data-sort-value="0.68" | 680 m || 
|-id=199 bgcolor=#fefefe
| 220199 ||  || — || November 5, 2002 || Socorro || LINEAR || NYS || align=right | 1.1 km || 
|-id=200 bgcolor=#fefefe
| 220200 ||  || — || November 5, 2002 || Socorro || LINEAR || — || align=right | 1.3 km || 
|}

220201–220300 

|-bgcolor=#fefefe
| 220201 ||  || — || November 5, 2002 || Socorro || LINEAR || — || align=right | 1.0 km || 
|-id=202 bgcolor=#fefefe
| 220202 ||  || — || November 5, 2002 || Socorro || LINEAR || NYS || align=right data-sort-value="0.91" | 910 m || 
|-id=203 bgcolor=#fefefe
| 220203 ||  || — || November 5, 2002 || Socorro || LINEAR || NYS || align=right data-sort-value="0.68" | 680 m || 
|-id=204 bgcolor=#fefefe
| 220204 ||  || — || November 5, 2002 || Socorro || LINEAR || — || align=right data-sort-value="0.86" | 860 m || 
|-id=205 bgcolor=#fefefe
| 220205 ||  || — || November 5, 2002 || Socorro || LINEAR || V || align=right data-sort-value="0.99" | 990 m || 
|-id=206 bgcolor=#fefefe
| 220206 ||  || — || November 5, 2002 || Socorro || LINEAR || — || align=right | 1.5 km || 
|-id=207 bgcolor=#fefefe
| 220207 ||  || — || November 1, 2002 || Palomar || NEAT || — || align=right data-sort-value="0.87" | 870 m || 
|-id=208 bgcolor=#fefefe
| 220208 ||  || — || November 4, 2002 || Haleakala || NEAT || — || align=right | 1.5 km || 
|-id=209 bgcolor=#fefefe
| 220209 ||  || — || November 5, 2002 || Socorro || LINEAR || — || align=right | 1.2 km || 
|-id=210 bgcolor=#fefefe
| 220210 ||  || — || November 5, 2002 || Socorro || LINEAR || V || align=right | 1.1 km || 
|-id=211 bgcolor=#fefefe
| 220211 ||  || — || November 6, 2002 || Socorro || LINEAR || — || align=right | 1.5 km || 
|-id=212 bgcolor=#fefefe
| 220212 ||  || — || November 6, 2002 || Anderson Mesa || LONEOS || — || align=right | 1.6 km || 
|-id=213 bgcolor=#fefefe
| 220213 ||  || — || November 7, 2002 || Socorro || LINEAR || NYS || align=right | 1.1 km || 
|-id=214 bgcolor=#fefefe
| 220214 ||  || — || November 7, 2002 || Socorro || LINEAR || — || align=right | 1.0 km || 
|-id=215 bgcolor=#fefefe
| 220215 ||  || — || November 8, 2002 || Socorro || LINEAR || — || align=right | 1.2 km || 
|-id=216 bgcolor=#fefefe
| 220216 ||  || — || November 11, 2002 || Socorro || LINEAR || NYS || align=right data-sort-value="0.84" | 840 m || 
|-id=217 bgcolor=#fefefe
| 220217 ||  || — || November 11, 2002 || Palomar || NEAT || — || align=right | 1.4 km || 
|-id=218 bgcolor=#E9E9E9
| 220218 ||  || — || November 12, 2002 || Socorro || LINEAR || — || align=right | 2.9 km || 
|-id=219 bgcolor=#FA8072
| 220219 ||  || — || November 13, 2002 || Socorro || LINEAR || — || align=right | 1.9 km || 
|-id=220 bgcolor=#fefefe
| 220220 ||  || — || November 13, 2002 || Socorro || LINEAR || H || align=right | 1.5 km || 
|-id=221 bgcolor=#fefefe
| 220221 ||  || — || November 10, 2002 || Socorro || LINEAR || V || align=right | 1.1 km || 
|-id=222 bgcolor=#fefefe
| 220222 ||  || — || November 12, 2002 || Socorro || LINEAR || V || align=right | 1.1 km || 
|-id=223 bgcolor=#fefefe
| 220223 ||  || — || November 12, 2002 || Socorro || LINEAR || — || align=right | 1.2 km || 
|-id=224 bgcolor=#fefefe
| 220224 ||  || — || November 13, 2002 || Socorro || LINEAR || — || align=right | 1.1 km || 
|-id=225 bgcolor=#E9E9E9
| 220225 ||  || — || November 13, 2002 || Palomar || NEAT || — || align=right | 3.6 km || 
|-id=226 bgcolor=#fefefe
| 220226 ||  || — || November 15, 2002 || Palomar || NEAT || — || align=right | 2.2 km || 
|-id=227 bgcolor=#fefefe
| 220227 ||  || — || November 12, 2002 || Socorro || LINEAR || — || align=right | 1.2 km || 
|-id=228 bgcolor=#fefefe
| 220228 ||  || — || November 6, 2002 || Socorro || LINEAR || NYS || align=right data-sort-value="0.67" | 670 m || 
|-id=229 bgcolor=#fefefe
| 220229 Hegedüs ||  ||  || November 1, 2002 || Palomar || NEAT || — || align=right | 1.1 km || 
|-id=230 bgcolor=#fefefe
| 220230 ||  || — || November 4, 2002 || Palomar || NEAT || NYS || align=right | 1.0 km || 
|-id=231 bgcolor=#fefefe
| 220231 ||  || — || November 23, 2002 || Palomar || NEAT || NYS || align=right | 1.0 km || 
|-id=232 bgcolor=#fefefe
| 220232 ||  || — || November 24, 2002 || Palomar || NEAT || NYS || align=right data-sort-value="0.81" | 810 m || 
|-id=233 bgcolor=#fefefe
| 220233 ||  || — || November 28, 2002 || Anderson Mesa || LONEOS || — || align=right | 1.1 km || 
|-id=234 bgcolor=#fefefe
| 220234 ||  || — || November 24, 2002 || Palomar || NEAT || — || align=right | 1.1 km || 
|-id=235 bgcolor=#fefefe
| 220235 ||  || — || December 1, 2002 || Socorro || LINEAR || NYS || align=right data-sort-value="0.83" | 830 m || 
|-id=236 bgcolor=#fefefe
| 220236 ||  || — || December 2, 2002 || Socorro || LINEAR || NYS || align=right data-sort-value="0.77" | 770 m || 
|-id=237 bgcolor=#fefefe
| 220237 ||  || — || December 3, 2002 || Haleakala || NEAT || — || align=right data-sort-value="0.88" | 880 m || 
|-id=238 bgcolor=#fefefe
| 220238 ||  || — || December 3, 2002 || Palomar || NEAT || NYS || align=right data-sort-value="0.83" | 830 m || 
|-id=239 bgcolor=#d6d6d6
| 220239 ||  || — || December 2, 2002 || Socorro || LINEAR || slow || align=right | 4.8 km || 
|-id=240 bgcolor=#FA8072
| 220240 ||  || — || December 5, 2002 || Socorro || LINEAR || — || align=right | 1.3 km || 
|-id=241 bgcolor=#fefefe
| 220241 ||  || — || December 5, 2002 || Socorro || LINEAR || NYS || align=right | 1.1 km || 
|-id=242 bgcolor=#fefefe
| 220242 ||  || — || December 5, 2002 || Socorro || LINEAR || MAS || align=right data-sort-value="0.93" | 930 m || 
|-id=243 bgcolor=#fefefe
| 220243 ||  || — || December 6, 2002 || Socorro || LINEAR || NYS || align=right data-sort-value="0.92" | 920 m || 
|-id=244 bgcolor=#fefefe
| 220244 ||  || — || December 8, 2002 || Desert Eagle || W. K. Y. Yeung || MAS || align=right data-sort-value="0.86" | 860 m || 
|-id=245 bgcolor=#fefefe
| 220245 ||  || — || December 10, 2002 || Badlands || Badlands Obs. || NYS || align=right data-sort-value="0.90" | 900 m || 
|-id=246 bgcolor=#fefefe
| 220246 ||  || — || December 8, 2002 || Palomar || NEAT || — || align=right | 3.6 km || 
|-id=247 bgcolor=#fefefe
| 220247 ||  || — || December 11, 2002 || Socorro || LINEAR || — || align=right | 1.4 km || 
|-id=248 bgcolor=#fefefe
| 220248 ||  || — || December 11, 2002 || Socorro || LINEAR || NYS || align=right data-sort-value="0.93" | 930 m || 
|-id=249 bgcolor=#fefefe
| 220249 ||  || — || December 11, 2002 || Socorro || LINEAR || NYS || align=right | 1.1 km || 
|-id=250 bgcolor=#fefefe
| 220250 ||  || — || December 11, 2002 || Socorro || LINEAR || — || align=right | 1.3 km || 
|-id=251 bgcolor=#fefefe
| 220251 ||  || — || December 11, 2002 || Socorro || LINEAR || V || align=right data-sort-value="0.91" | 910 m || 
|-id=252 bgcolor=#fefefe
| 220252 ||  || — || December 12, 2002 || Palomar || NEAT || — || align=right | 1.3 km || 
|-id=253 bgcolor=#fefefe
| 220253 ||  || — || December 5, 2002 || Socorro || LINEAR || MAS || align=right data-sort-value="0.95" | 950 m || 
|-id=254 bgcolor=#fefefe
| 220254 ||  || — || December 5, 2002 || Socorro || LINEAR || NYS || align=right data-sort-value="0.90" | 900 m || 
|-id=255 bgcolor=#fefefe
| 220255 ||  || — || December 5, 2002 || Socorro || LINEAR || — || align=right | 1.7 km || 
|-id=256 bgcolor=#fefefe
| 220256 ||  || — || December 10, 2002 || Palomar || NEAT || NYS || align=right data-sort-value="0.85" | 850 m || 
|-id=257 bgcolor=#fefefe
| 220257 ||  || — || December 7, 2002 || Palomar || NEAT || MAS || align=right | 1.1 km || 
|-id=258 bgcolor=#fefefe
| 220258 ||  || — || December 31, 2002 || Socorro || LINEAR || NYS || align=right | 1.1 km || 
|-id=259 bgcolor=#fefefe
| 220259 ||  || — || December 31, 2002 || Socorro || LINEAR || MAS || align=right | 1.2 km || 
|-id=260 bgcolor=#fefefe
| 220260 ||  || — || December 31, 2002 || Socorro || LINEAR || — || align=right | 1.5 km || 
|-id=261 bgcolor=#fefefe
| 220261 ||  || — || December 31, 2002 || Socorro || LINEAR || V || align=right | 1.3 km || 
|-id=262 bgcolor=#fefefe
| 220262 ||  || — || December 31, 2002 || Socorro || LINEAR || NYS || align=right | 1.2 km || 
|-id=263 bgcolor=#E9E9E9
| 220263 ||  || — || January 1, 2003 || Socorro || LINEAR || — || align=right | 1.9 km || 
|-id=264 bgcolor=#fefefe
| 220264 ||  || — || January 5, 2003 || Socorro || LINEAR || — || align=right | 1.2 km || 
|-id=265 bgcolor=#E9E9E9
| 220265 ||  || — || January 4, 2003 || Socorro || LINEAR || — || align=right | 1.6 km || 
|-id=266 bgcolor=#fefefe
| 220266 ||  || — || January 4, 2003 || Socorro || LINEAR || NYS || align=right data-sort-value="0.94" | 940 m || 
|-id=267 bgcolor=#fefefe
| 220267 ||  || — || January 7, 2003 || Socorro || LINEAR || — || align=right | 1.6 km || 
|-id=268 bgcolor=#fefefe
| 220268 ||  || — || January 7, 2003 || Socorro || LINEAR || — || align=right | 2.7 km || 
|-id=269 bgcolor=#fefefe
| 220269 ||  || — || January 5, 2003 || Socorro || LINEAR || NYS || align=right | 1.0 km || 
|-id=270 bgcolor=#fefefe
| 220270 ||  || — || January 5, 2003 || Socorro || LINEAR || — || align=right | 1.3 km || 
|-id=271 bgcolor=#fefefe
| 220271 ||  || — || January 5, 2003 || Socorro || LINEAR || NYS || align=right | 2.3 km || 
|-id=272 bgcolor=#fefefe
| 220272 ||  || — || January 8, 2003 || Socorro || LINEAR || NYS || align=right data-sort-value="0.96" | 960 m || 
|-id=273 bgcolor=#fefefe
| 220273 ||  || — || January 10, 2003 || Socorro || LINEAR || — || align=right | 1.2 km || 
|-id=274 bgcolor=#E9E9E9
| 220274 ||  || — || January 10, 2003 || Socorro || LINEAR || — || align=right | 1.9 km || 
|-id=275 bgcolor=#fefefe
| 220275 ||  || — || January 10, 2003 || Kitt Peak || Spacewatch || NYS || align=right data-sort-value="0.90" | 900 m || 
|-id=276 bgcolor=#fefefe
| 220276 ||  || — || January 1, 2003 || Socorro || LINEAR || — || align=right | 1.4 km || 
|-id=277 bgcolor=#E9E9E9
| 220277 ||  || — || January 26, 2003 || Haleakala || NEAT || — || align=right | 2.5 km || 
|-id=278 bgcolor=#fefefe
| 220278 ||  || — || January 26, 2003 || Haleakala || NEAT || — || align=right | 1.4 km || 
|-id=279 bgcolor=#fefefe
| 220279 ||  || — || January 27, 2003 || Socorro || LINEAR || — || align=right | 1.4 km || 
|-id=280 bgcolor=#E9E9E9
| 220280 ||  || — || January 27, 2003 || Socorro || LINEAR || — || align=right | 2.5 km || 
|-id=281 bgcolor=#E9E9E9
| 220281 ||  || — || January 28, 2003 || Palomar || NEAT || MAR || align=right | 2.0 km || 
|-id=282 bgcolor=#fefefe
| 220282 ||  || — || January 26, 2003 || Anderson Mesa || LONEOS || — || align=right | 1.3 km || 
|-id=283 bgcolor=#fefefe
| 220283 ||  || — || January 29, 2003 || Palomar || NEAT || MAS || align=right | 1.2 km || 
|-id=284 bgcolor=#fefefe
| 220284 ||  || — || January 28, 2003 || Kitt Peak || Spacewatch || — || align=right | 1.4 km || 
|-id=285 bgcolor=#E9E9E9
| 220285 ||  || — || January 30, 2003 || Anderson Mesa || LONEOS || — || align=right | 1.7 km || 
|-id=286 bgcolor=#fefefe
| 220286 ||  || — || January 28, 2003 || Haleakala || NEAT || — || align=right | 1.4 km || 
|-id=287 bgcolor=#fefefe
| 220287 ||  || — || January 30, 2003 || Socorro || LINEAR || — || align=right | 1.2 km || 
|-id=288 bgcolor=#E9E9E9
| 220288 ||  || — || January 31, 2003 || Anderson Mesa || LONEOS || — || align=right | 3.0 km || 
|-id=289 bgcolor=#E9E9E9
| 220289 ||  || — || January 31, 2003 || Socorro || LINEAR || — || align=right | 1.5 km || 
|-id=290 bgcolor=#fefefe
| 220290 ||  || — || January 28, 2003 || Kitt Peak || Spacewatch || — || align=right data-sort-value="0.91" | 910 m || 
|-id=291 bgcolor=#E9E9E9
| 220291 ||  || — || February 2, 2003 || Anderson Mesa || LONEOS || — || align=right | 4.7 km || 
|-id=292 bgcolor=#fefefe
| 220292 ||  || — || February 2, 2003 || Anderson Mesa || LONEOS || — || align=right | 1.5 km || 
|-id=293 bgcolor=#fefefe
| 220293 ||  || — || February 2, 2003 || Socorro || LINEAR || — || align=right | 1.2 km || 
|-id=294 bgcolor=#E9E9E9
| 220294 ||  || — || February 6, 2003 || Palomar || NEAT || — || align=right | 2.1 km || 
|-id=295 bgcolor=#E9E9E9
| 220295 ||  || — || February 6, 2003 || Socorro || LINEAR || MIT || align=right | 3.5 km || 
|-id=296 bgcolor=#E9E9E9
| 220296 ||  || — || February 13, 2003 || La Silla || R. Michelsen, G. Masi || — || align=right | 1.8 km || 
|-id=297 bgcolor=#E9E9E9
| 220297 ||  || — || February 10, 2003 || Bergisch Gladbach || W. Bickel || — || align=right | 2.7 km || 
|-id=298 bgcolor=#E9E9E9
| 220298 ||  || — || February 19, 2003 || Palomar || NEAT || — || align=right | 1.4 km || 
|-id=299 bgcolor=#fefefe
| 220299 ||  || — || March 5, 2003 || Socorro || LINEAR || H || align=right data-sort-value="0.89" | 890 m || 
|-id=300 bgcolor=#E9E9E9
| 220300 ||  || — || March 5, 2003 || Socorro || LINEAR || MAR || align=right | 1.2 km || 
|}

220301–220400 

|-bgcolor=#E9E9E9
| 220301 ||  || — || March 5, 2003 || Socorro || LINEAR || — || align=right | 4.0 km || 
|-id=302 bgcolor=#E9E9E9
| 220302 ||  || — || March 6, 2003 || Socorro || LINEAR || — || align=right | 4.1 km || 
|-id=303 bgcolor=#E9E9E9
| 220303 ||  || — || March 6, 2003 || Socorro || LINEAR || — || align=right | 1.2 km || 
|-id=304 bgcolor=#E9E9E9
| 220304 ||  || — || March 6, 2003 || Anderson Mesa || LONEOS || — || align=right | 1.2 km || 
|-id=305 bgcolor=#fefefe
| 220305 ||  || — || March 5, 2003 || Socorro || LINEAR || H || align=right data-sort-value="0.76" | 760 m || 
|-id=306 bgcolor=#E9E9E9
| 220306 ||  || — || March 6, 2003 || Anderson Mesa || LONEOS || — || align=right | 3.1 km || 
|-id=307 bgcolor=#E9E9E9
| 220307 ||  || — || March 6, 2003 || Palomar || NEAT || — || align=right | 1.2 km || 
|-id=308 bgcolor=#E9E9E9
| 220308 ||  || — || March 7, 2003 || Anderson Mesa || LONEOS || — || align=right | 1.4 km || 
|-id=309 bgcolor=#fefefe
| 220309 ||  || — || March 8, 2003 || Anderson Mesa || LONEOS || H || align=right | 1.1 km || 
|-id=310 bgcolor=#E9E9E9
| 220310 ||  || — || March 8, 2003 || Anderson Mesa || LONEOS || — || align=right | 3.8 km || 
|-id=311 bgcolor=#E9E9E9
| 220311 ||  || — || March 10, 2003 || Socorro || LINEAR || RAF || align=right | 1.8 km || 
|-id=312 bgcolor=#C2FFFF
| 220312 ||  || — || March 10, 2003 || Kitt Peak || Spacewatch || L4 || align=right | 12 km || 
|-id=313 bgcolor=#E9E9E9
| 220313 ||  || — || March 7, 2003 || Socorro || LINEAR || DOR || align=right | 3.9 km || 
|-id=314 bgcolor=#E9E9E9
| 220314 ||  || — || March 8, 2003 || Anderson Mesa || LONEOS || — || align=right | 1.7 km || 
|-id=315 bgcolor=#fefefe
| 220315 ||  || — || March 14, 2003 || Haleakala || NEAT || H || align=right | 1.2 km || 
|-id=316 bgcolor=#E9E9E9
| 220316 ||  || — || March 11, 2003 || Campo Imperatore || CINEOS || — || align=right | 1.6 km || 
|-id=317 bgcolor=#E9E9E9
| 220317 ||  || — || March 9, 2003 || Palomar || NEAT || — || align=right | 2.3 km || 
|-id=318 bgcolor=#C2FFFF
| 220318 ||  || — || March 10, 2003 || Anderson Mesa || LONEOS || L4 || align=right | 15 km || 
|-id=319 bgcolor=#fefefe
| 220319 ||  || — || March 31, 2003 || Anderson Mesa || LONEOS || H || align=right data-sort-value="0.80" | 800 m || 
|-id=320 bgcolor=#E9E9E9
| 220320 ||  || — || March 23, 2003 || Kitt Peak || Spacewatch || AGN || align=right | 1.5 km || 
|-id=321 bgcolor=#E9E9E9
| 220321 ||  || — || March 22, 2003 || Kvistaberg || UDAS || HNS || align=right | 2.7 km || 
|-id=322 bgcolor=#E9E9E9
| 220322 ||  || — || March 24, 2003 || Kitt Peak || Spacewatch || — || align=right | 3.4 km || 
|-id=323 bgcolor=#E9E9E9
| 220323 ||  || — || March 24, 2003 || Kitt Peak || Spacewatch || — || align=right | 1.9 km || 
|-id=324 bgcolor=#C2FFFF
| 220324 ||  || — || March 23, 2003 || Kitt Peak || Spacewatch || L4 || align=right | 15 km || 
|-id=325 bgcolor=#fefefe
| 220325 ||  || — || March 25, 2003 || Palomar || NEAT || — || align=right data-sort-value="0.99" | 990 m || 
|-id=326 bgcolor=#E9E9E9
| 220326 ||  || — || March 26, 2003 || Palomar || NEAT || — || align=right | 2.3 km || 
|-id=327 bgcolor=#E9E9E9
| 220327 ||  || — || March 27, 2003 || Palomar || NEAT || — || align=right | 2.7 km || 
|-id=328 bgcolor=#E9E9E9
| 220328 ||  || — || March 30, 2003 || Kitt Peak || Spacewatch || — || align=right | 3.5 km || 
|-id=329 bgcolor=#d6d6d6
| 220329 ||  || — || March 30, 2003 || Kitt Peak || Spacewatch || — || align=right | 4.2 km || 
|-id=330 bgcolor=#d6d6d6
| 220330 ||  || — || March 23, 2003 || Goodricke-Pigott || R. A. Tucker || TIR || align=right | 3.5 km || 
|-id=331 bgcolor=#E9E9E9
| 220331 ||  || — || March 30, 2003 || Kitt Peak || M. W. Buie || — || align=right | 2.1 km || 
|-id=332 bgcolor=#E9E9E9
| 220332 ||  || — || March 26, 2003 || Haleakala || NEAT || EUN || align=right | 1.7 km || 
|-id=333 bgcolor=#C2FFFF
| 220333 ||  || — || March 27, 2003 || Kitt Peak || Spacewatch || L4 || align=right | 8.9 km || 
|-id=334 bgcolor=#E9E9E9
| 220334 ||  || — || April 1, 2003 || Socorro || LINEAR || — || align=right | 3.5 km || 
|-id=335 bgcolor=#C2FFFF
| 220335 ||  || — || April 3, 2003 || Anderson Mesa || LONEOS || L4 || align=right | 15 km || 
|-id=336 bgcolor=#C2FFFF
| 220336 ||  || — || April 3, 2003 || Anderson Mesa || LONEOS || L4 || align=right | 9.9 km || 
|-id=337 bgcolor=#E9E9E9
| 220337 ||  || — || April 1, 2003 || Kitt Peak || Spacewatch || — || align=right | 1.1 km || 
|-id=338 bgcolor=#E9E9E9
| 220338 ||  || — || April 1, 2003 || Socorro || LINEAR || EUN || align=right | 2.4 km || 
|-id=339 bgcolor=#E9E9E9
| 220339 ||  || — || April 4, 2003 || Socorro || LINEAR || — || align=right | 3.9 km || 
|-id=340 bgcolor=#E9E9E9
| 220340 ||  || — || April 4, 2003 || Kitt Peak || Spacewatch || HEN || align=right | 1.3 km || 
|-id=341 bgcolor=#E9E9E9
| 220341 ||  || — || April 5, 2003 || Reedy Creek || J. Broughton || — || align=right | 2.6 km || 
|-id=342 bgcolor=#C2FFFF
| 220342 ||  || — || April 7, 2003 || Kitt Peak || Spacewatch || L4 || align=right | 10 km || 
|-id=343 bgcolor=#E9E9E9
| 220343 ||  || — || April 8, 2003 || Socorro || LINEAR || HNS || align=right | 1.9 km || 
|-id=344 bgcolor=#E9E9E9
| 220344 ||  || — || April 9, 2003 || Palomar || NEAT || — || align=right | 3.5 km || 
|-id=345 bgcolor=#d6d6d6
| 220345 ||  || — || April 9, 2003 || Socorro || LINEAR || — || align=right | 4.4 km || 
|-id=346 bgcolor=#E9E9E9
| 220346 ||  || — || April 1, 2003 || Kitt Peak || M. W. Buie || PAD || align=right | 2.6 km || 
|-id=347 bgcolor=#E9E9E9
| 220347 ||  || — || April 11, 2003 || Anderson Mesa || LONEOS || — || align=right | 3.8 km || 
|-id=348 bgcolor=#E9E9E9
| 220348 ||  || — || April 24, 2003 || Anderson Mesa || LONEOS || VIB || align=right | 2.8 km || 
|-id=349 bgcolor=#E9E9E9
| 220349 ||  || — || April 26, 2003 || Kitt Peak || Spacewatch || HEN || align=right | 1.4 km || 
|-id=350 bgcolor=#d6d6d6
| 220350 ||  || — || April 24, 2003 || Kitt Peak || Spacewatch || K-2 || align=right | 1.9 km || 
|-id=351 bgcolor=#C2FFFF
| 220351 ||  || — || April 24, 2003 || Kitt Peak || Spacewatch || L4 || align=right | 16 km || 
|-id=352 bgcolor=#E9E9E9
| 220352 ||  || — || April 25, 2003 || Kitt Peak || Spacewatch || — || align=right | 1.4 km || 
|-id=353 bgcolor=#E9E9E9
| 220353 ||  || — || April 25, 2003 || Campo Imperatore || CINEOS || — || align=right | 4.3 km || 
|-id=354 bgcolor=#E9E9E9
| 220354 ||  || — || May 1, 2003 || Socorro || LINEAR || — || align=right | 4.2 km || 
|-id=355 bgcolor=#C2FFFF
| 220355 ||  || — || May 3, 2003 || Kitt Peak || Spacewatch || L4 || align=right | 11 km || 
|-id=356 bgcolor=#C2FFFF
| 220356 ||  || — || May 6, 2003 || Kitt Peak || Spacewatch || L4 || align=right | 15 km || 
|-id=357 bgcolor=#d6d6d6
| 220357 ||  || — || June 26, 2003 || Socorro || LINEAR || — || align=right | 4.6 km || 
|-id=358 bgcolor=#d6d6d6
| 220358 ||  || — || June 26, 2003 || Socorro || LINEAR || — || align=right | 5.2 km || 
|-id=359 bgcolor=#d6d6d6
| 220359 ||  || — || July 1, 2003 || Socorro || LINEAR || MEL || align=right | 5.3 km || 
|-id=360 bgcolor=#d6d6d6
| 220360 ||  || — || July 1, 2003 || Haleakala || NEAT || TIR || align=right | 4.8 km || 
|-id=361 bgcolor=#E9E9E9
| 220361 ||  || — || July 6, 2003 || Mount Graham || W. H. Ryan, C. T. Martinez || — || align=right | 2.3 km || 
|-id=362 bgcolor=#d6d6d6
| 220362 ||  || — || July 7, 2003 || Socorro || LINEAR || EUP || align=right | 5.2 km || 
|-id=363 bgcolor=#d6d6d6
| 220363 ||  || — || July 8, 2003 || Kitt Peak || Spacewatch || — || align=right | 2.9 km || 
|-id=364 bgcolor=#d6d6d6
| 220364 ||  || — || July 5, 2003 || Kitt Peak || Spacewatch || — || align=right | 4.1 km || 
|-id=365 bgcolor=#d6d6d6
| 220365 ||  || — || July 4, 2003 || Kitt Peak || Spacewatch || THB || align=right | 3.5 km || 
|-id=366 bgcolor=#d6d6d6
| 220366 ||  || — || July 22, 2003 || Haleakala || NEAT || — || align=right | 5.2 km || 
|-id=367 bgcolor=#d6d6d6
| 220367 ||  || — || July 26, 2003 || Reedy Creek || J. Broughton || — || align=right | 4.7 km || 
|-id=368 bgcolor=#d6d6d6
| 220368 ||  || — || July 23, 2003 || Palomar || NEAT || — || align=right | 4.4 km || 
|-id=369 bgcolor=#d6d6d6
| 220369 ||  || — || July 25, 2003 || Palomar || NEAT || — || align=right | 4.5 km || 
|-id=370 bgcolor=#d6d6d6
| 220370 ||  || — || July 27, 2003 || Socorro || LINEAR || — || align=right | 7.2 km || 
|-id=371 bgcolor=#d6d6d6
| 220371 ||  || — || July 28, 2003 || Palomar || NEAT || — || align=right | 3.3 km || 
|-id=372 bgcolor=#d6d6d6
| 220372 ||  || — || July 22, 2003 || Palomar || NEAT || — || align=right | 6.3 km || 
|-id=373 bgcolor=#d6d6d6
| 220373 ||  || — || July 22, 2003 || Palomar || NEAT || THB || align=right | 5.6 km || 
|-id=374 bgcolor=#d6d6d6
| 220374 ||  || — || July 24, 2003 || Palomar || NEAT || — || align=right | 4.8 km || 
|-id=375 bgcolor=#d6d6d6
| 220375 ||  || — || July 24, 2003 || Palomar || NEAT || — || align=right | 4.1 km || 
|-id=376 bgcolor=#d6d6d6
| 220376 ||  || — || July 23, 2003 || Palomar || NEAT || — || align=right | 4.0 km || 
|-id=377 bgcolor=#d6d6d6
| 220377 || 2003 PV || — || August 1, 2003 || Socorro || LINEAR || — || align=right | 4.9 km || 
|-id=378 bgcolor=#d6d6d6
| 220378 || 2003 QQ || — || August 18, 2003 || Campo Imperatore || CINEOS || — || align=right | 5.3 km || 
|-id=379 bgcolor=#d6d6d6
| 220379 ||  || — || August 18, 2003 || Campo Imperatore || CINEOS || EOS || align=right | 3.7 km || 
|-id=380 bgcolor=#d6d6d6
| 220380 ||  || — || August 20, 2003 || Palomar || NEAT || — || align=right | 3.7 km || 
|-id=381 bgcolor=#d6d6d6
| 220381 ||  || — || August 20, 2003 || Palomar || NEAT || — || align=right | 6.8 km || 
|-id=382 bgcolor=#d6d6d6
| 220382 ||  || — || August 20, 2003 || Reedy Creek || J. Broughton || — || align=right | 5.8 km || 
|-id=383 bgcolor=#d6d6d6
| 220383 ||  || — || August 22, 2003 || Palomar || NEAT || — || align=right | 6.0 km || 
|-id=384 bgcolor=#d6d6d6
| 220384 ||  || — || August 23, 2003 || Socorro || LINEAR || — || align=right | 5.9 km || 
|-id=385 bgcolor=#d6d6d6
| 220385 ||  || — || August 23, 2003 || Socorro || LINEAR || ALA || align=right | 5.5 km || 
|-id=386 bgcolor=#d6d6d6
| 220386 ||  || — || August 23, 2003 || Socorro || LINEAR || — || align=right | 3.9 km || 
|-id=387 bgcolor=#d6d6d6
| 220387 ||  || — || August 20, 2003 || Campo Imperatore || CINEOS || THM || align=right | 3.3 km || 
|-id=388 bgcolor=#d6d6d6
| 220388 ||  || — || August 22, 2003 || Palomar || NEAT || — || align=right | 5.8 km || 
|-id=389 bgcolor=#d6d6d6
| 220389 ||  || — || August 25, 2003 || Socorro || LINEAR || — || align=right | 5.7 km || 
|-id=390 bgcolor=#d6d6d6
| 220390 ||  || — || August 23, 2003 || Palomar || NEAT || — || align=right | 6.5 km || 
|-id=391 bgcolor=#d6d6d6
| 220391 ||  || — || August 23, 2003 || Palomar || NEAT || — || align=right | 6.4 km || 
|-id=392 bgcolor=#d6d6d6
| 220392 ||  || — || August 24, 2003 || Socorro || LINEAR || — || align=right | 5.3 km || 
|-id=393 bgcolor=#FA8072
| 220393 ||  || — || August 25, 2003 || Socorro || LINEAR || H || align=right | 1.1 km || 
|-id=394 bgcolor=#d6d6d6
| 220394 ||  || — || August 30, 2003 || Kitt Peak || Spacewatch || HYG || align=right | 3.9 km || 
|-id=395 bgcolor=#d6d6d6
| 220395 ||  || — || August 31, 2003 || Socorro || LINEAR || — || align=right | 4.8 km || 
|-id=396 bgcolor=#d6d6d6
| 220396 ||  || — || September 3, 2003 || Socorro || LINEAR || — || align=right | 6.6 km || 
|-id=397 bgcolor=#d6d6d6
| 220397 ||  || — || September 12, 2003 || Wrightwood || J. W. Young || THM || align=right | 3.5 km || 
|-id=398 bgcolor=#d6d6d6
| 220398 ||  || — || September 13, 2003 || Anderson Mesa || LONEOS || — || align=right | 3.0 km || 
|-id=399 bgcolor=#d6d6d6
| 220399 ||  || — || September 15, 2003 || Palomar || NEAT || URS || align=right | 6.5 km || 
|-id=400 bgcolor=#d6d6d6
| 220400 ||  || — || September 15, 2003 || Anderson Mesa || LONEOS || — || align=right | 3.0 km || 
|}

220401–220500 

|-bgcolor=#d6d6d6
| 220401 ||  || — || September 16, 2003 || Haleakala || NEAT || — || align=right | 7.9 km || 
|-id=402 bgcolor=#d6d6d6
| 220402 ||  || — || September 16, 2003 || Palomar || NEAT || 7:4 || align=right | 6.6 km || 
|-id=403 bgcolor=#d6d6d6
| 220403 ||  || — || September 18, 2003 || Kitt Peak || Spacewatch || — || align=right | 5.9 km || 
|-id=404 bgcolor=#d6d6d6
| 220404 ||  || — || September 16, 2003 || Anderson Mesa || LONEOS || — || align=right | 5.7 km || 
|-id=405 bgcolor=#d6d6d6
| 220405 ||  || — || September 16, 2003 || Anderson Mesa || LONEOS || — || align=right | 5.6 km || 
|-id=406 bgcolor=#d6d6d6
| 220406 ||  || — || September 16, 2003 || Anderson Mesa || LONEOS || — || align=right | 6.1 km || 
|-id=407 bgcolor=#d6d6d6
| 220407 ||  || — || September 17, 2003 || Anderson Mesa || LONEOS || — || align=right | 4.9 km || 
|-id=408 bgcolor=#d6d6d6
| 220408 ||  || — || September 18, 2003 || Socorro || LINEAR || HYG || align=right | 5.2 km || 
|-id=409 bgcolor=#d6d6d6
| 220409 ||  || — || September 18, 2003 || Kitt Peak || Spacewatch || — || align=right | 4.2 km || 
|-id=410 bgcolor=#d6d6d6
| 220410 ||  || — || September 18, 2003 || Palomar || NEAT || — || align=right | 7.2 km || 
|-id=411 bgcolor=#d6d6d6
| 220411 ||  || — || September 18, 2003 || Anderson Mesa || LONEOS || — || align=right | 3.7 km || 
|-id=412 bgcolor=#d6d6d6
| 220412 ||  || — || September 20, 2003 || Haleakala || NEAT || 7:4 || align=right | 5.6 km || 
|-id=413 bgcolor=#d6d6d6
| 220413 ||  || — || September 20, 2003 || Palomar || NEAT || — || align=right | 3.5 km || 
|-id=414 bgcolor=#d6d6d6
| 220414 ||  || — || September 20, 2003 || Socorro || LINEAR || — || align=right | 4.1 km || 
|-id=415 bgcolor=#d6d6d6
| 220415 ||  || — || September 20, 2003 || Kitt Peak || Spacewatch || — || align=right | 4.8 km || 
|-id=416 bgcolor=#d6d6d6
| 220416 ||  || — || September 20, 2003 || Palomar || NEAT || — || align=right | 4.1 km || 
|-id=417 bgcolor=#d6d6d6
| 220417 ||  || — || September 21, 2003 || Anderson Mesa || LONEOS || — || align=right | 6.9 km || 
|-id=418 bgcolor=#d6d6d6
| 220418 Golovyno ||  ||  || September 23, 2003 || Andrushivka || Andrushivka Obs. || — || align=right | 4.5 km || 
|-id=419 bgcolor=#d6d6d6
| 220419 ||  || — || September 24, 2003 || Palomar || NEAT || THM || align=right | 4.4 km || 
|-id=420 bgcolor=#d6d6d6
| 220420 ||  || — || September 24, 2003 || Palomar || NEAT || HYG || align=right | 4.0 km || 
|-id=421 bgcolor=#d6d6d6
| 220421 ||  || — || September 26, 2003 || Socorro || LINEAR || — || align=right | 5.2 km || 
|-id=422 bgcolor=#d6d6d6
| 220422 ||  || — || September 28, 2003 || Socorro || LINEAR || — || align=right | 4.5 km || 
|-id=423 bgcolor=#d6d6d6
| 220423 ||  || — || September 20, 2003 || Socorro || LINEAR || — || align=right | 5.9 km || 
|-id=424 bgcolor=#d6d6d6
| 220424 ||  || — || September 29, 2003 || Anderson Mesa || LONEOS || — || align=right | 5.0 km || 
|-id=425 bgcolor=#d6d6d6
| 220425 ||  || — || September 17, 2003 || Palomar || NEAT || SYL7:4 || align=right | 6.5 km || 
|-id=426 bgcolor=#d6d6d6
| 220426 ||  || — || September 22, 2003 || Anderson Mesa || LONEOS || ALA || align=right | 4.5 km || 
|-id=427 bgcolor=#d6d6d6
| 220427 ||  || — || October 3, 2003 || Kitt Peak || Spacewatch || — || align=right | 4.8 km || 
|-id=428 bgcolor=#FA8072
| 220428 ||  || — || October 17, 2003 || Kitt Peak || Spacewatch || — || align=right data-sort-value="0.62" | 620 m || 
|-id=429 bgcolor=#d6d6d6
| 220429 ||  || — || October 17, 2003 || Kitt Peak || Spacewatch || — || align=right | 5.2 km || 
|-id=430 bgcolor=#d6d6d6
| 220430 ||  || — || October 18, 2003 || Kitt Peak || Spacewatch || — || align=right | 5.1 km || 
|-id=431 bgcolor=#d6d6d6
| 220431 ||  || — || October 18, 2003 || Palomar || NEAT || — || align=right | 5.2 km || 
|-id=432 bgcolor=#d6d6d6
| 220432 ||  || — || October 16, 2003 || Anderson Mesa || LONEOS || EUP || align=right | 6.0 km || 
|-id=433 bgcolor=#d6d6d6
| 220433 ||  || — || October 21, 2003 || Palomar || NEAT || 7:4 || align=right | 5.2 km || 
|-id=434 bgcolor=#d6d6d6
| 220434 ||  || — || October 23, 2003 || Kitt Peak || Spacewatch || — || align=right | 5.0 km || 
|-id=435 bgcolor=#d6d6d6
| 220435 ||  || — || October 27, 2003 || Anderson Mesa || LONEOS || 7:4 || align=right | 7.0 km || 
|-id=436 bgcolor=#fefefe
| 220436 ||  || — || October 30, 2003 || Socorro || LINEAR || — || align=right | 1.2 km || 
|-id=437 bgcolor=#d6d6d6
| 220437 ||  || — || October 16, 2003 || Kitt Peak || Spacewatch || EOS || align=right | 3.4 km || 
|-id=438 bgcolor=#d6d6d6
| 220438 ||  || — || November 18, 2003 || Socorro || LINEAR || EUP || align=right | 6.7 km || 
|-id=439 bgcolor=#d6d6d6
| 220439 ||  || — || November 18, 2003 || Palomar || NEAT || — || align=right | 5.7 km || 
|-id=440 bgcolor=#fefefe
| 220440 ||  || — || November 19, 2003 || Kitt Peak || Spacewatch || — || align=right | 1.3 km || 
|-id=441 bgcolor=#d6d6d6
| 220441 ||  || — || November 21, 2003 || Socorro || LINEAR || EUP || align=right | 5.6 km || 
|-id=442 bgcolor=#d6d6d6
| 220442 ||  || — || November 18, 2003 || Kitt Peak || Spacewatch || HYG || align=right | 5.0 km || 
|-id=443 bgcolor=#d6d6d6
| 220443 ||  || — || November 21, 2003 || Socorro || LINEAR || — || align=right | 4.1 km || 
|-id=444 bgcolor=#fefefe
| 220444 ||  || — || November 23, 2003 || Kitt Peak || M. W. Buie || — || align=right | 2.3 km || 
|-id=445 bgcolor=#fefefe
| 220445 ||  || — || November 24, 2003 || Anderson Mesa || LONEOS || — || align=right data-sort-value="0.94" | 940 m || 
|-id=446 bgcolor=#fefefe
| 220446 ||  || — || December 17, 2003 || Palomar || NEAT || — || align=right | 1.2 km || 
|-id=447 bgcolor=#fefefe
| 220447 ||  || — || December 19, 2003 || Kitt Peak || Spacewatch || FLO || align=right data-sort-value="0.81" | 810 m || 
|-id=448 bgcolor=#fefefe
| 220448 ||  || — || December 19, 2003 || Socorro || LINEAR || FLO || align=right | 1.3 km || 
|-id=449 bgcolor=#fefefe
| 220449 ||  || — || December 22, 2003 || Kitt Peak || Spacewatch || — || align=right | 3.7 km || 
|-id=450 bgcolor=#d6d6d6
| 220450 ||  || — || December 23, 2003 || Socorro || LINEAR || — || align=right | 3.7 km || 
|-id=451 bgcolor=#fefefe
| 220451 ||  || — || December 23, 2003 || Socorro || LINEAR || — || align=right | 1.2 km || 
|-id=452 bgcolor=#FA8072
| 220452 ||  || — || December 27, 2003 || Socorro || LINEAR || — || align=right | 1.0 km || 
|-id=453 bgcolor=#fefefe
| 220453 ||  || — || December 27, 2003 || Socorro || LINEAR || FLO || align=right data-sort-value="0.99" | 990 m || 
|-id=454 bgcolor=#fefefe
| 220454 ||  || — || December 28, 2003 || Socorro || LINEAR || FLO || align=right data-sort-value="0.86" | 860 m || 
|-id=455 bgcolor=#fefefe
| 220455 ||  || — || December 17, 2003 || Kitt Peak || Spacewatch || — || align=right data-sort-value="0.75" | 750 m || 
|-id=456 bgcolor=#fefefe
| 220456 ||  || — || January 13, 2004 || Anderson Mesa || LONEOS || — || align=right | 1.2 km || 
|-id=457 bgcolor=#fefefe
| 220457 ||  || — || January 17, 2004 || Haleakala || NEAT || — || align=right | 1.2 km || 
|-id=458 bgcolor=#fefefe
| 220458 ||  || — || January 16, 2004 || Palomar || NEAT || — || align=right | 1.6 km || 
|-id=459 bgcolor=#fefefe
| 220459 ||  || — || January 19, 2004 || Kitt Peak || Spacewatch || — || align=right | 1.1 km || 
|-id=460 bgcolor=#fefefe
| 220460 ||  || — || January 18, 2004 || Palomar || NEAT || — || align=right | 1.3 km || 
|-id=461 bgcolor=#d6d6d6
| 220461 ||  || — || January 19, 2004 || Kitt Peak || Spacewatch || 3:2 || align=right | 7.3 km || 
|-id=462 bgcolor=#fefefe
| 220462 ||  || — || January 19, 2004 || Kitt Peak || Spacewatch || — || align=right | 1.1 km || 
|-id=463 bgcolor=#fefefe
| 220463 ||  || — || January 21, 2004 || Socorro || LINEAR || FLO || align=right | 1.2 km || 
|-id=464 bgcolor=#fefefe
| 220464 ||  || — || January 21, 2004 || Socorro || LINEAR || — || align=right data-sort-value="0.87" | 870 m || 
|-id=465 bgcolor=#fefefe
| 220465 ||  || — || January 21, 2004 || Socorro || LINEAR || NYS || align=right data-sort-value="0.95" | 950 m || 
|-id=466 bgcolor=#fefefe
| 220466 ||  || — || January 23, 2004 || Anderson Mesa || LONEOS || V || align=right | 1.1 km || 
|-id=467 bgcolor=#fefefe
| 220467 ||  || — || January 24, 2004 || Socorro || LINEAR || — || align=right | 1.2 km || 
|-id=468 bgcolor=#fefefe
| 220468 ||  || — || January 22, 2004 || Socorro || LINEAR || — || align=right | 1.2 km || 
|-id=469 bgcolor=#fefefe
| 220469 ||  || — || January 22, 2004 || Socorro || LINEAR || — || align=right data-sort-value="0.98" | 980 m || 
|-id=470 bgcolor=#fefefe
| 220470 ||  || — || January 27, 2004 || Kitt Peak || Spacewatch || V || align=right data-sort-value="0.91" | 910 m || 
|-id=471 bgcolor=#fefefe
| 220471 ||  || — || January 29, 2004 || Kitt Peak || Spacewatch || — || align=right | 1.3 km || 
|-id=472 bgcolor=#fefefe
| 220472 ||  || — || January 18, 2004 || Haleakala || NEAT || — || align=right | 1.5 km || 
|-id=473 bgcolor=#fefefe
| 220473 ||  || — || January 28, 2004 || Catalina || CSS || — || align=right | 1.5 km || 
|-id=474 bgcolor=#fefefe
| 220474 ||  || — || January 19, 2004 || Kitt Peak || Spacewatch || — || align=right data-sort-value="0.82" | 820 m || 
|-id=475 bgcolor=#fefefe
| 220475 ||  || — || January 19, 2004 || Kitt Peak || Spacewatch || NYS || align=right data-sort-value="0.70" | 700 m || 
|-id=476 bgcolor=#fefefe
| 220476 ||  || — || February 10, 2004 || Palomar || NEAT || V || align=right | 1.0 km || 
|-id=477 bgcolor=#fefefe
| 220477 ||  || — || February 11, 2004 || Palomar || NEAT || V || align=right | 1.1 km || 
|-id=478 bgcolor=#fefefe
| 220478 ||  || — || February 11, 2004 || Kitt Peak || Spacewatch || FLO || align=right data-sort-value="0.93" | 930 m || 
|-id=479 bgcolor=#fefefe
| 220479 ||  || — || February 12, 2004 || Kitt Peak || Spacewatch || V || align=right data-sort-value="0.73" | 730 m || 
|-id=480 bgcolor=#fefefe
| 220480 ||  || — || February 10, 2004 || Palomar || NEAT || FLO || align=right data-sort-value="0.87" | 870 m || 
|-id=481 bgcolor=#fefefe
| 220481 ||  || — || February 12, 2004 || Kitt Peak || Spacewatch || NYS || align=right data-sort-value="0.98" | 980 m || 
|-id=482 bgcolor=#fefefe
| 220482 ||  || — || February 11, 2004 || Palomar || NEAT || — || align=right | 1.3 km || 
|-id=483 bgcolor=#fefefe
| 220483 ||  || — || February 11, 2004 || Palomar || NEAT || ERI || align=right | 2.2 km || 
|-id=484 bgcolor=#fefefe
| 220484 ||  || — || February 12, 2004 || Kitt Peak || Spacewatch || NYS || align=right data-sort-value="0.91" | 910 m || 
|-id=485 bgcolor=#fefefe
| 220485 ||  || — || February 12, 2004 || Palomar || NEAT || — || align=right | 1.3 km || 
|-id=486 bgcolor=#fefefe
| 220486 ||  || — || February 11, 2004 || Palomar || NEAT || NYS || align=right data-sort-value="0.78" | 780 m || 
|-id=487 bgcolor=#fefefe
| 220487 ||  || — || February 11, 2004 || Palomar || NEAT || — || align=right data-sort-value="0.84" | 840 m || 
|-id=488 bgcolor=#fefefe
| 220488 ||  || — || February 12, 2004 || Kitt Peak || Spacewatch || V || align=right | 1.1 km || 
|-id=489 bgcolor=#fefefe
| 220489 ||  || — || February 13, 2004 || Kitt Peak || Spacewatch || MAS || align=right data-sort-value="0.92" | 920 m || 
|-id=490 bgcolor=#fefefe
| 220490 ||  || — || February 13, 2004 || Palomar || NEAT || V || align=right | 1.1 km || 
|-id=491 bgcolor=#fefefe
| 220491 ||  || — || February 12, 2004 || Kitt Peak || Spacewatch || — || align=right data-sort-value="0.99" | 990 m || 
|-id=492 bgcolor=#fefefe
| 220492 ||  || — || February 12, 2004 || Kitt Peak || Spacewatch || NYS || align=right data-sort-value="0.90" | 900 m || 
|-id=493 bgcolor=#fefefe
| 220493 ||  || — || February 14, 2004 || Kitt Peak || Spacewatch || — || align=right | 1.4 km || 
|-id=494 bgcolor=#fefefe
| 220494 || 2004 DK || — || February 16, 2004 || Desert Eagle || W. K. Y. Yeung || FLO || align=right | 1.2 km || 
|-id=495 bgcolor=#fefefe
| 220495 Margarethe || 2004 DO ||  || February 17, 2004 || Wildberg || R. Apitzsch || PHO || align=right | 1.7 km || 
|-id=496 bgcolor=#fefefe
| 220496 ||  || — || February 16, 2004 || Kvistaberg || UDAS || — || align=right | 1.4 km || 
|-id=497 bgcolor=#fefefe
| 220497 ||  || — || February 16, 2004 || Socorro || LINEAR || NYS || align=right data-sort-value="0.85" | 850 m || 
|-id=498 bgcolor=#fefefe
| 220498 ||  || — || February 18, 2004 || Haleakala || NEAT || — || align=right | 1.3 km || 
|-id=499 bgcolor=#fefefe
| 220499 ||  || — || February 16, 2004 || Desert Eagle || W. K. Y. Yeung || — || align=right | 1.5 km || 
|-id=500 bgcolor=#fefefe
| 220500 ||  || — || February 16, 2004 || Kitt Peak || Spacewatch || NYS || align=right | 2.1 km || 
|}

220501–220600 

|-bgcolor=#fefefe
| 220501 ||  || — || February 18, 2004 || Socorro || LINEAR || NYS || align=right data-sort-value="0.80" | 800 m || 
|-id=502 bgcolor=#fefefe
| 220502 ||  || — || February 17, 2004 || Catalina || CSS || — || align=right | 1.2 km || 
|-id=503 bgcolor=#fefefe
| 220503 ||  || — || February 17, 2004 || Catalina || CSS || V || align=right | 1.1 km || 
|-id=504 bgcolor=#fefefe
| 220504 ||  || — || February 17, 2004 || Kitt Peak || Spacewatch || — || align=right | 1.0 km || 
|-id=505 bgcolor=#fefefe
| 220505 ||  || — || February 18, 2004 || Socorro || LINEAR || FLO || align=right | 1.2 km || 
|-id=506 bgcolor=#fefefe
| 220506 ||  || — || February 19, 2004 || Socorro || LINEAR || — || align=right | 1.2 km || 
|-id=507 bgcolor=#fefefe
| 220507 ||  || — || February 25, 2004 || Desert Eagle || W. K. Y. Yeung || — || align=right | 1.0 km || 
|-id=508 bgcolor=#fefefe
| 220508 ||  || — || February 19, 2004 || Socorro || LINEAR || V || align=right data-sort-value="0.98" | 980 m || 
|-id=509 bgcolor=#fefefe
| 220509 ||  || — || February 26, 2004 || Socorro || LINEAR || — || align=right | 1.00 km || 
|-id=510 bgcolor=#fefefe
| 220510 ||  || — || March 12, 2004 || Palomar || NEAT || MAS || align=right | 1.1 km || 
|-id=511 bgcolor=#fefefe
| 220511 ||  || — || March 15, 2004 || Palomar || NEAT || PHO || align=right | 2.0 km || 
|-id=512 bgcolor=#fefefe
| 220512 ||  || — || March 12, 2004 || Palomar || NEAT || V || align=right | 1.2 km || 
|-id=513 bgcolor=#fefefe
| 220513 ||  || — || March 14, 2004 || Kitt Peak || Spacewatch || — || align=right | 1.2 km || 
|-id=514 bgcolor=#fefefe
| 220514 ||  || — || March 15, 2004 || Kitt Peak || Spacewatch || — || align=right | 1.0 km || 
|-id=515 bgcolor=#fefefe
| 220515 ||  || — || March 15, 2004 || Desert Eagle || W. K. Y. Yeung || FLO || align=right | 1.2 km || 
|-id=516 bgcolor=#fefefe
| 220516 ||  || — || March 15, 2004 || Kitt Peak || Spacewatch || MAS || align=right data-sort-value="0.91" | 910 m || 
|-id=517 bgcolor=#fefefe
| 220517 ||  || — || March 12, 2004 || Palomar || NEAT || NYS || align=right | 1.2 km || 
|-id=518 bgcolor=#fefefe
| 220518 ||  || — || March 15, 2004 || Palomar || NEAT || — || align=right | 1.5 km || 
|-id=519 bgcolor=#fefefe
| 220519 ||  || — || March 11, 2004 || Palomar || NEAT || — || align=right | 1.4 km || 
|-id=520 bgcolor=#fefefe
| 220520 ||  || — || March 13, 2004 || Palomar || NEAT || — || align=right | 1.5 km || 
|-id=521 bgcolor=#fefefe
| 220521 ||  || — || March 15, 2004 || Kitt Peak || Spacewatch || NYS || align=right data-sort-value="0.93" | 930 m || 
|-id=522 bgcolor=#fefefe
| 220522 ||  || — || March 15, 2004 || Kitt Peak || Spacewatch || V || align=right data-sort-value="0.88" | 880 m || 
|-id=523 bgcolor=#fefefe
| 220523 ||  || — || March 15, 2004 || Catalina || CSS || NYS || align=right data-sort-value="0.89" | 890 m || 
|-id=524 bgcolor=#fefefe
| 220524 ||  || — || March 15, 2004 || Catalina || CSS || — || align=right | 1.3 km || 
|-id=525 bgcolor=#E9E9E9
| 220525 ||  || — || March 14, 2004 || Kitt Peak || Spacewatch || — || align=right | 1.7 km || 
|-id=526 bgcolor=#fefefe
| 220526 ||  || — || March 15, 2004 || Socorro || LINEAR || — || align=right | 3.2 km || 
|-id=527 bgcolor=#fefefe
| 220527 ||  || — || March 11, 2004 || Palomar || NEAT || V || align=right data-sort-value="0.91" | 910 m || 
|-id=528 bgcolor=#fefefe
| 220528 ||  || — || March 14, 2004 || Kitt Peak || Spacewatch || — || align=right | 1.0 km || 
|-id=529 bgcolor=#fefefe
| 220529 ||  || — || March 28, 2004 || Desert Eagle || W. K. Y. Yeung || NYS || align=right data-sort-value="0.83" | 830 m || 
|-id=530 bgcolor=#C2FFFF
| 220530 ||  || — || March 26, 2004 || Kitt Peak || DLS || L4 || align=right | 10 km || 
|-id=531 bgcolor=#fefefe
| 220531 ||  || — || March 17, 2004 || Kitt Peak || Spacewatch || NYS || align=right data-sort-value="0.88" | 880 m || 
|-id=532 bgcolor=#fefefe
| 220532 ||  || — || March 17, 2004 || Socorro || LINEAR || — || align=right | 1.2 km || 
|-id=533 bgcolor=#fefefe
| 220533 ||  || — || March 29, 2004 || Socorro || LINEAR || — || align=right | 3.9 km || 
|-id=534 bgcolor=#E9E9E9
| 220534 ||  || — || March 16, 2004 || Socorro || LINEAR || — || align=right | 1.6 km || 
|-id=535 bgcolor=#fefefe
| 220535 ||  || — || March 16, 2004 || Socorro || LINEAR || V || align=right | 1.4 km || 
|-id=536 bgcolor=#fefefe
| 220536 ||  || — || March 18, 2004 || Socorro || LINEAR || MAS || align=right data-sort-value="0.99" | 990 m || 
|-id=537 bgcolor=#fefefe
| 220537 ||  || — || March 18, 2004 || Socorro || LINEAR || FLO || align=right | 1.7 km || 
|-id=538 bgcolor=#fefefe
| 220538 ||  || — || March 19, 2004 || Kitt Peak || Spacewatch || NYS || align=right data-sort-value="0.86" | 860 m || 
|-id=539 bgcolor=#fefefe
| 220539 ||  || — || March 17, 2004 || Kitt Peak || Spacewatch || — || align=right data-sort-value="0.95" | 950 m || 
|-id=540 bgcolor=#fefefe
| 220540 ||  || — || March 22, 2004 || Socorro || LINEAR || NYS || align=right | 1.0 km || 
|-id=541 bgcolor=#fefefe
| 220541 ||  || — || March 25, 2004 || Anderson Mesa || LONEOS || — || align=right | 1.1 km || 
|-id=542 bgcolor=#fefefe
| 220542 ||  || — || March 22, 2004 || Socorro || LINEAR || FLO || align=right | 1.2 km || 
|-id=543 bgcolor=#fefefe
| 220543 ||  || — || March 27, 2004 || Kitt Peak || Spacewatch || MAS || align=right data-sort-value="0.83" | 830 m || 
|-id=544 bgcolor=#fefefe
| 220544 ||  || — || March 27, 2004 || Kitt Peak || Spacewatch || — || align=right | 1.1 km || 
|-id=545 bgcolor=#fefefe
| 220545 ||  || — || March 27, 2004 || Socorro || LINEAR || NYS || align=right | 1.0 km || 
|-id=546 bgcolor=#fefefe
| 220546 ||  || — || March 18, 2004 || Socorro || LINEAR || V || align=right | 1.1 km || 
|-id=547 bgcolor=#fefefe
| 220547 ||  || — || March 18, 2004 || Kitt Peak || Spacewatch || NYS || align=right | 1.2 km || 
|-id=548 bgcolor=#fefefe
| 220548 ||  || — || April 12, 2004 || Palomar || NEAT || V || align=right | 1.1 km || 
|-id=549 bgcolor=#E9E9E9
| 220549 ||  || — || April 12, 2004 || Palomar || NEAT || — || align=right | 1.4 km || 
|-id=550 bgcolor=#E9E9E9
| 220550 ||  || — || April 13, 2004 || Palomar || NEAT || — || align=right | 3.1 km || 
|-id=551 bgcolor=#fefefe
| 220551 ||  || — || April 11, 2004 || Palomar || NEAT || V || align=right | 1.1 km || 
|-id=552 bgcolor=#E9E9E9
| 220552 ||  || — || April 14, 2004 || Palomar || NEAT || JUN || align=right | 1.6 km || 
|-id=553 bgcolor=#fefefe
| 220553 ||  || — || April 15, 2004 || Anderson Mesa || LONEOS || NYS || align=right | 1.2 km || 
|-id=554 bgcolor=#E9E9E9
| 220554 ||  || — || April 13, 2004 || Kitt Peak || Spacewatch || JUN || align=right | 1.3 km || 
|-id=555 bgcolor=#C2FFFF
| 220555 ||  || — || April 13, 2004 || Palomar || NEAT || L4 || align=right | 12 km || 
|-id=556 bgcolor=#E9E9E9
| 220556 ||  || — || April 16, 2004 || Palomar || NEAT || RAF || align=right | 1.5 km || 
|-id=557 bgcolor=#fefefe
| 220557 ||  || — || April 16, 2004 || Palomar || NEAT || NYS || align=right data-sort-value="0.93" | 930 m || 
|-id=558 bgcolor=#fefefe
| 220558 ||  || — || April 16, 2004 || Palomar || NEAT || MAS || align=right | 1.1 km || 
|-id=559 bgcolor=#E9E9E9
| 220559 ||  || — || April 17, 2004 || Socorro || LINEAR || — || align=right | 1.5 km || 
|-id=560 bgcolor=#E9E9E9
| 220560 ||  || — || April 17, 2004 || Anderson Mesa || LONEOS || — || align=right | 3.7 km || 
|-id=561 bgcolor=#fefefe
| 220561 ||  || — || April 17, 2004 || Socorro || LINEAR || NYS || align=right data-sort-value="0.96" | 960 m || 
|-id=562 bgcolor=#E9E9E9
| 220562 ||  || — || April 17, 2004 || Palomar || NEAT || — || align=right | 2.3 km || 
|-id=563 bgcolor=#fefefe
| 220563 ||  || — || April 20, 2004 || Kitt Peak || Spacewatch || — || align=right | 1.9 km || 
|-id=564 bgcolor=#E9E9E9
| 220564 ||  || — || April 20, 2004 || Catalina || CSS || — || align=right | 1.4 km || 
|-id=565 bgcolor=#fefefe
| 220565 ||  || — || April 16, 2004 || Kitt Peak || Spacewatch || NYS || align=right data-sort-value="0.79" | 790 m || 
|-id=566 bgcolor=#fefefe
| 220566 ||  || — || April 20, 2004 || Socorro || LINEAR || FLO || align=right data-sort-value="0.81" | 810 m || 
|-id=567 bgcolor=#E9E9E9
| 220567 ||  || — || April 21, 2004 || Catalina || CSS || — || align=right | 2.9 km || 
|-id=568 bgcolor=#E9E9E9
| 220568 ||  || — || April 20, 2004 || Socorro || LINEAR || — || align=right | 2.9 km || 
|-id=569 bgcolor=#E9E9E9
| 220569 ||  || — || April 22, 2004 || Catalina || CSS || MAR || align=right | 1.7 km || 
|-id=570 bgcolor=#C2FFFF
| 220570 ||  || — || April 24, 2004 || Kitt Peak || Spacewatch || L4 || align=right | 13 km || 
|-id=571 bgcolor=#E9E9E9
| 220571 ||  || — || April 25, 2004 || Socorro || LINEAR || JUN || align=right | 1.5 km || 
|-id=572 bgcolor=#E9E9E9
| 220572 ||  || — || April 21, 2004 || Campo Imperatore || CINEOS || — || align=right | 2.0 km || 
|-id=573 bgcolor=#E9E9E9
| 220573 ||  || — || April 21, 2004 || Kitt Peak || Spacewatch || — || align=right | 1.0 km || 
|-id=574 bgcolor=#C2FFFF
| 220574 ||  || — || April 21, 2004 || Kitt Peak || Spacewatch || L4 || align=right | 11 km || 
|-id=575 bgcolor=#E9E9E9
| 220575 ||  || — || April 23, 2004 || Reedy Creek || J. Broughton || MAR || align=right | 1.8 km || 
|-id=576 bgcolor=#E9E9E9
| 220576 ||  || — || April 24, 2004 || Socorro || LINEAR || — || align=right | 2.9 km || 
|-id=577 bgcolor=#fefefe
| 220577 ||  || — || April 20, 2004 || Kitt Peak || Spacewatch || — || align=right | 1.1 km || 
|-id=578 bgcolor=#fefefe
| 220578 || 2004 JG || — || May 8, 2004 || Wrightwood || J. W. Young || PHO || align=right | 1.6 km || 
|-id=579 bgcolor=#E9E9E9
| 220579 ||  || — || May 12, 2004 || Socorro || LINEAR || BRU || align=right | 3.3 km || 
|-id=580 bgcolor=#fefefe
| 220580 ||  || — || May 10, 2004 || Kitt Peak || Spacewatch || — || align=right | 1.1 km || 
|-id=581 bgcolor=#E9E9E9
| 220581 ||  || — || May 12, 2004 || Catalina || CSS || RAF || align=right | 1.2 km || 
|-id=582 bgcolor=#E9E9E9
| 220582 ||  || — || May 10, 2004 || Palomar || NEAT || — || align=right | 1.2 km || 
|-id=583 bgcolor=#fefefe
| 220583 ||  || — || May 13, 2004 || Kitt Peak || Spacewatch || — || align=right | 1.3 km || 
|-id=584 bgcolor=#E9E9E9
| 220584 ||  || — || May 15, 2004 || Socorro || LINEAR || EUN || align=right | 2.4 km || 
|-id=585 bgcolor=#E9E9E9
| 220585 ||  || — || May 15, 2004 || Socorro || LINEAR || — || align=right | 1.3 km || 
|-id=586 bgcolor=#E9E9E9
| 220586 ||  || — || May 9, 2004 || Kitt Peak || Spacewatch || — || align=right | 2.1 km || 
|-id=587 bgcolor=#E9E9E9
| 220587 ||  || — || May 14, 2004 || Socorro || LINEAR || — || align=right | 1.7 km || 
|-id=588 bgcolor=#fefefe
| 220588 ||  || — || May 21, 2004 || Socorro || LINEAR || NYS || align=right data-sort-value="0.94" | 940 m || 
|-id=589 bgcolor=#E9E9E9
| 220589 ||  || — || May 20, 2004 || Bergisch Gladbach || W. Bickel || — || align=right | 2.3 km || 
|-id=590 bgcolor=#E9E9E9
| 220590 ||  || — || May 24, 2004 || Socorro || LINEAR || ADE || align=right | 3.0 km || 
|-id=591 bgcolor=#E9E9E9
| 220591 ||  || — || June 7, 2004 || Catalina || CSS || — || align=right | 2.3 km || 
|-id=592 bgcolor=#E9E9E9
| 220592 ||  || — || June 11, 2004 || Palomar || NEAT || — || align=right | 1.4 km || 
|-id=593 bgcolor=#E9E9E9
| 220593 ||  || — || June 15, 2004 || Socorro || LINEAR || VIB || align=right | 2.9 km || 
|-id=594 bgcolor=#E9E9E9
| 220594 ||  || — || July 12, 2004 || Reedy Creek || J. Broughton || AEO || align=right | 1.4 km || 
|-id=595 bgcolor=#E9E9E9
| 220595 ||  || — || July 9, 2004 || Palomar || NEAT || — || align=right | 4.0 km || 
|-id=596 bgcolor=#E9E9E9
| 220596 ||  || — || July 11, 2004 || Socorro || LINEAR || — || align=right | 2.0 km || 
|-id=597 bgcolor=#E9E9E9
| 220597 ||  || — || July 11, 2004 || Socorro || LINEAR || — || align=right | 3.9 km || 
|-id=598 bgcolor=#E9E9E9
| 220598 ||  || — || July 11, 2004 || Socorro || LINEAR || — || align=right | 3.2 km || 
|-id=599 bgcolor=#E9E9E9
| 220599 ||  || — || July 14, 2004 || Socorro || LINEAR || — || align=right | 2.2 km || 
|-id=600 bgcolor=#E9E9E9
| 220600 ||  || — || July 11, 2004 || Palomar || NEAT || CLO || align=right | 2.7 km || 
|}

220601–220700 

|-bgcolor=#E9E9E9
| 220601 ||  || — || July 16, 2004 || Socorro || LINEAR || DOR || align=right | 3.6 km || 
|-id=602 bgcolor=#E9E9E9
| 220602 ||  || — || July 16, 2004 || Socorro || LINEAR || DOR || align=right | 3.3 km || 
|-id=603 bgcolor=#E9E9E9
| 220603 ||  || — || July 20, 2004 || Reedy Creek || J. Broughton || HNA || align=right | 2.9 km || 
|-id=604 bgcolor=#E9E9E9
| 220604 ||  || — || August 6, 2004 || Palomar || NEAT || MRX || align=right | 1.8 km || 
|-id=605 bgcolor=#E9E9E9
| 220605 ||  || — || August 6, 2004 || Palomar || NEAT || GEF || align=right | 1.8 km || 
|-id=606 bgcolor=#E9E9E9
| 220606 ||  || — || August 6, 2004 || Palomar || NEAT || MRX || align=right | 1.6 km || 
|-id=607 bgcolor=#E9E9E9
| 220607 ||  || — || August 6, 2004 || Palomar || NEAT || GEF || align=right | 2.1 km || 
|-id=608 bgcolor=#E9E9E9
| 220608 ||  || — || August 7, 2004 || Palomar || NEAT || — || align=right | 3.0 km || 
|-id=609 bgcolor=#d6d6d6
| 220609 ||  || — || August 7, 2004 || Palomar || NEAT || — || align=right | 3.9 km || 
|-id=610 bgcolor=#d6d6d6
| 220610 ||  || — || August 7, 2004 || Campo Imperatore || CINEOS || — || align=right | 3.7 km || 
|-id=611 bgcolor=#d6d6d6
| 220611 ||  || — || August 6, 2004 || Palomar || NEAT || YAK || align=right | 3.9 km || 
|-id=612 bgcolor=#E9E9E9
| 220612 ||  || — || August 8, 2004 || Palomar || NEAT || MRX || align=right | 1.6 km || 
|-id=613 bgcolor=#E9E9E9
| 220613 ||  || — || August 9, 2004 || Socorro || LINEAR || — || align=right | 3.6 km || 
|-id=614 bgcolor=#E9E9E9
| 220614 ||  || — || August 8, 2004 || Anderson Mesa || LONEOS || — || align=right | 4.1 km || 
|-id=615 bgcolor=#E9E9E9
| 220615 ||  || — || August 8, 2004 || Anderson Mesa || LONEOS || — || align=right | 2.8 km || 
|-id=616 bgcolor=#E9E9E9
| 220616 ||  || — || August 9, 2004 || Socorro || LINEAR || HOF || align=right | 3.9 km || 
|-id=617 bgcolor=#E9E9E9
| 220617 ||  || — || August 6, 2004 || Palomar || NEAT || — || align=right | 2.5 km || 
|-id=618 bgcolor=#E9E9E9
| 220618 ||  || — || August 9, 2004 || Socorro || LINEAR || — || align=right | 3.0 km || 
|-id=619 bgcolor=#E9E9E9
| 220619 ||  || — || August 9, 2004 || Socorro || LINEAR || — || align=right | 3.5 km || 
|-id=620 bgcolor=#d6d6d6
| 220620 ||  || — || August 9, 2004 || Socorro || LINEAR || — || align=right | 4.8 km || 
|-id=621 bgcolor=#E9E9E9
| 220621 ||  || — || August 10, 2004 || Socorro || LINEAR || PAE || align=right | 3.4 km || 
|-id=622 bgcolor=#d6d6d6
| 220622 ||  || — || August 11, 2004 || Socorro || LINEAR || — || align=right | 7.0 km || 
|-id=623 bgcolor=#E9E9E9
| 220623 ||  || — || August 9, 2004 || Socorro || LINEAR || — || align=right | 4.0 km || 
|-id=624 bgcolor=#E9E9E9
| 220624 ||  || — || August 10, 2004 || Socorro || LINEAR || GEF || align=right | 2.1 km || 
|-id=625 bgcolor=#E9E9E9
| 220625 ||  || — || August 14, 2004 || Palomar || NEAT || CLO || align=right | 3.8 km || 
|-id=626 bgcolor=#d6d6d6
| 220626 ||  || — || August 15, 2004 || Nashville || R. Clingan || CHA || align=right | 2.3 km || 
|-id=627 bgcolor=#d6d6d6
| 220627 ||  || — || August 12, 2004 || Socorro || LINEAR || CHA || align=right | 3.7 km || 
|-id=628 bgcolor=#E9E9E9
| 220628 ||  || — || August 12, 2004 || Siding Spring || SSS || ADE || align=right | 4.2 km || 
|-id=629 bgcolor=#E9E9E9
| 220629 ||  || — || August 15, 2004 || Kleť || Kleť Obs. || AGN || align=right | 1.5 km || 
|-id=630 bgcolor=#d6d6d6
| 220630 ||  || — || August 13, 2004 || Palomar || NEAT || SAN || align=right | 2.3 km || 
|-id=631 bgcolor=#E9E9E9
| 220631 ||  || — || August 21, 2004 || Reedy Creek || J. Broughton || — || align=right | 4.2 km || 
|-id=632 bgcolor=#E9E9E9
| 220632 ||  || — || August 21, 2004 || Catalina || CSS || — || align=right | 4.2 km || 
|-id=633 bgcolor=#E9E9E9
| 220633 ||  || — || August 21, 2004 || Catalina || CSS || GEF || align=right | 2.2 km || 
|-id=634 bgcolor=#d6d6d6
| 220634 ||  || — || August 30, 2004 || Wrightwood || J. W. Young || KOR || align=right | 2.1 km || 
|-id=635 bgcolor=#fefefe
| 220635 ||  || — || August 26, 2004 || Siding Spring || SSS || H || align=right | 1.1 km || 
|-id=636 bgcolor=#d6d6d6
| 220636 ||  || — || September 7, 2004 || Kitt Peak || Spacewatch || — || align=right | 3.3 km || 
|-id=637 bgcolor=#E9E9E9
| 220637 ||  || — || September 7, 2004 || Kitt Peak || Spacewatch || PAD || align=right | 2.0 km || 
|-id=638 bgcolor=#d6d6d6
| 220638 ||  || — || September 7, 2004 || Socorro || LINEAR || — || align=right | 3.2 km || 
|-id=639 bgcolor=#d6d6d6
| 220639 ||  || — || September 7, 2004 || Socorro || LINEAR || BRA || align=right | 2.8 km || 
|-id=640 bgcolor=#d6d6d6
| 220640 ||  || — || September 7, 2004 || Kitt Peak || Spacewatch || KOR || align=right | 1.6 km || 
|-id=641 bgcolor=#E9E9E9
| 220641 ||  || — || September 8, 2004 || Socorro || LINEAR || — || align=right | 2.9 km || 
|-id=642 bgcolor=#d6d6d6
| 220642 ||  || — || September 8, 2004 || Socorro || LINEAR || EOS || align=right | 3.0 km || 
|-id=643 bgcolor=#d6d6d6
| 220643 ||  || — || September 8, 2004 || Socorro || LINEAR || — || align=right | 4.0 km || 
|-id=644 bgcolor=#E9E9E9
| 220644 ||  || — || September 8, 2004 || Socorro || LINEAR || — || align=right | 3.4 km || 
|-id=645 bgcolor=#d6d6d6
| 220645 ||  || — || September 8, 2004 || Socorro || LINEAR || KOR || align=right | 2.3 km || 
|-id=646 bgcolor=#d6d6d6
| 220646 ||  || — || September 8, 2004 || Socorro || LINEAR || — || align=right | 3.9 km || 
|-id=647 bgcolor=#d6d6d6
| 220647 ||  || — || September 8, 2004 || Socorro || LINEAR || — || align=right | 3.7 km || 
|-id=648 bgcolor=#d6d6d6
| 220648 ||  || — || September 9, 2004 || Socorro || LINEAR || — || align=right | 4.5 km || 
|-id=649 bgcolor=#E9E9E9
| 220649 ||  || — || September 7, 2004 || Socorro || LINEAR || — || align=right | 2.8 km || 
|-id=650 bgcolor=#E9E9E9
| 220650 ||  || — || September 8, 2004 || Socorro || LINEAR || — || align=right | 4.1 km || 
|-id=651 bgcolor=#d6d6d6
| 220651 ||  || — || September 8, 2004 || Socorro || LINEAR || — || align=right | 4.9 km || 
|-id=652 bgcolor=#d6d6d6
| 220652 ||  || — || September 8, 2004 || Palomar || NEAT || — || align=right | 4.4 km || 
|-id=653 bgcolor=#d6d6d6
| 220653 ||  || — || September 8, 2004 || Palomar || NEAT || — || align=right | 4.4 km || 
|-id=654 bgcolor=#E9E9E9
| 220654 ||  || — || September 7, 2004 || Kitt Peak || Spacewatch || — || align=right | 3.5 km || 
|-id=655 bgcolor=#d6d6d6
| 220655 ||  || — || September 7, 2004 || Kitt Peak || Spacewatch || KOR || align=right | 1.8 km || 
|-id=656 bgcolor=#d6d6d6
| 220656 ||  || — || September 8, 2004 || Palomar || NEAT || — || align=right | 4.7 km || 
|-id=657 bgcolor=#d6d6d6
| 220657 ||  || — || September 9, 2004 || Socorro || LINEAR || — || align=right | 3.5 km || 
|-id=658 bgcolor=#d6d6d6
| 220658 ||  || — || September 9, 2004 || Socorro || LINEAR || KOR || align=right | 2.3 km || 
|-id=659 bgcolor=#d6d6d6
| 220659 ||  || — || September 10, 2004 || Socorro || LINEAR || — || align=right | 4.4 km || 
|-id=660 bgcolor=#d6d6d6
| 220660 ||  || — || September 11, 2004 || Socorro || LINEAR || ALA || align=right | 4.7 km || 
|-id=661 bgcolor=#d6d6d6
| 220661 ||  || — || September 11, 2004 || Socorro || LINEAR || — || align=right | 5.8 km || 
|-id=662 bgcolor=#d6d6d6
| 220662 ||  || — || September 7, 2004 || Kitt Peak || Spacewatch || — || align=right | 4.2 km || 
|-id=663 bgcolor=#d6d6d6
| 220663 ||  || — || September 10, 2004 || Socorro || LINEAR || — || align=right | 4.5 km || 
|-id=664 bgcolor=#d6d6d6
| 220664 ||  || — || September 10, 2004 || Socorro || LINEAR || — || align=right | 4.5 km || 
|-id=665 bgcolor=#d6d6d6
| 220665 ||  || — || September 10, 2004 || Socorro || LINEAR || — || align=right | 3.9 km || 
|-id=666 bgcolor=#d6d6d6
| 220666 ||  || — || September 10, 2004 || Socorro || LINEAR || — || align=right | 4.6 km || 
|-id=667 bgcolor=#d6d6d6
| 220667 ||  || — || September 10, 2004 || Socorro || LINEAR || — || align=right | 5.9 km || 
|-id=668 bgcolor=#d6d6d6
| 220668 ||  || — || September 10, 2004 || Socorro || LINEAR || EOS || align=right | 2.9 km || 
|-id=669 bgcolor=#d6d6d6
| 220669 ||  || — || September 10, 2004 || Socorro || LINEAR || EOS || align=right | 3.0 km || 
|-id=670 bgcolor=#d6d6d6
| 220670 ||  || — || September 10, 2004 || Socorro || LINEAR || — || align=right | 3.9 km || 
|-id=671 bgcolor=#d6d6d6
| 220671 ||  || — || September 10, 2004 || Socorro || LINEAR || MEL || align=right | 5.5 km || 
|-id=672 bgcolor=#d6d6d6
| 220672 ||  || — || September 10, 2004 || Kitt Peak || Spacewatch || — || align=right | 5.3 km || 
|-id=673 bgcolor=#E9E9E9
| 220673 ||  || — || September 11, 2004 || Socorro || LINEAR || — || align=right | 5.0 km || 
|-id=674 bgcolor=#d6d6d6
| 220674 ||  || — || September 11, 2004 || Socorro || LINEAR || — || align=right | 4.4 km || 
|-id=675 bgcolor=#d6d6d6
| 220675 ||  || — || September 11, 2004 || Socorro || LINEAR || — || align=right | 5.5 km || 
|-id=676 bgcolor=#d6d6d6
| 220676 ||  || — || September 11, 2004 || Socorro || LINEAR || — || align=right | 5.8 km || 
|-id=677 bgcolor=#d6d6d6
| 220677 ||  || — || September 11, 2004 || Socorro || LINEAR || — || align=right | 5.4 km || 
|-id=678 bgcolor=#d6d6d6
| 220678 ||  || — || September 11, 2004 || Socorro || LINEAR || — || align=right | 5.3 km || 
|-id=679 bgcolor=#d6d6d6
| 220679 ||  || — || September 11, 2004 || Socorro || LINEAR || — || align=right | 5.5 km || 
|-id=680 bgcolor=#d6d6d6
| 220680 ||  || — || September 11, 2004 || Socorro || LINEAR || — || align=right | 5.1 km || 
|-id=681 bgcolor=#E9E9E9
| 220681 ||  || — || September 11, 2004 || Socorro || LINEAR || — || align=right | 2.8 km || 
|-id=682 bgcolor=#d6d6d6
| 220682 ||  || — || September 11, 2004 || Socorro || LINEAR || URS || align=right | 4.6 km || 
|-id=683 bgcolor=#d6d6d6
| 220683 ||  || — || September 9, 2004 || Kitt Peak || Spacewatch || HYG || align=right | 4.3 km || 
|-id=684 bgcolor=#d6d6d6
| 220684 ||  || — || September 9, 2004 || Kitt Peak || Spacewatch || — || align=right | 4.5 km || 
|-id=685 bgcolor=#d6d6d6
| 220685 ||  || — || September 9, 2004 || Kitt Peak || Spacewatch || — || align=right | 3.7 km || 
|-id=686 bgcolor=#d6d6d6
| 220686 ||  || — || September 10, 2004 || Kitt Peak || Spacewatch || — || align=right | 3.9 km || 
|-id=687 bgcolor=#d6d6d6
| 220687 ||  || — || September 10, 2004 || Kitt Peak || Spacewatch || — || align=right | 3.1 km || 
|-id=688 bgcolor=#d6d6d6
| 220688 ||  || — || September 15, 2004 || 7300 Observatory || W. K. Y. Yeung || — || align=right | 4.6 km || 
|-id=689 bgcolor=#d6d6d6
| 220689 ||  || — || September 15, 2004 || 7300 Observatory || W. K. Y. Yeung || EOS || align=right | 3.1 km || 
|-id=690 bgcolor=#d6d6d6
| 220690 ||  || — || September 8, 2004 || Socorro || LINEAR || — || align=right | 4.0 km || 
|-id=691 bgcolor=#d6d6d6
| 220691 ||  || — || September 9, 2004 || Kitt Peak || Spacewatch || — || align=right | 3.4 km || 
|-id=692 bgcolor=#d6d6d6
| 220692 ||  || — || September 10, 2004 || Socorro || LINEAR || — || align=right | 3.4 km || 
|-id=693 bgcolor=#d6d6d6
| 220693 ||  || — || September 13, 2004 || Socorro || LINEAR || EOS || align=right | 3.2 km || 
|-id=694 bgcolor=#d6d6d6
| 220694 ||  || — || September 13, 2004 || Socorro || LINEAR || — || align=right | 4.3 km || 
|-id=695 bgcolor=#d6d6d6
| 220695 ||  || — || September 15, 2004 || Kitt Peak || Spacewatch || — || align=right | 4.2 km || 
|-id=696 bgcolor=#d6d6d6
| 220696 ||  || — || September 8, 2004 || Socorro || LINEAR || — || align=right | 4.5 km || 
|-id=697 bgcolor=#d6d6d6
| 220697 ||  || — || September 13, 2004 || Socorro || LINEAR || — || align=right | 6.1 km || 
|-id=698 bgcolor=#d6d6d6
| 220698 ||  || — || September 13, 2004 || Socorro || LINEAR || EUP || align=right | 5.7 km || 
|-id=699 bgcolor=#d6d6d6
| 220699 ||  || — || September 13, 2004 || Socorro || LINEAR || TEL || align=right | 2.3 km || 
|-id=700 bgcolor=#d6d6d6
| 220700 ||  || — || September 13, 2004 || Socorro || LINEAR || — || align=right | 3.7 km || 
|}

220701–220800 

|-bgcolor=#d6d6d6
| 220701 ||  || — || September 13, 2004 || Socorro || LINEAR || — || align=right | 4.8 km || 
|-id=702 bgcolor=#d6d6d6
| 220702 ||  || — || September 13, 2004 || Socorro || LINEAR || — || align=right | 5.1 km || 
|-id=703 bgcolor=#fefefe
| 220703 ||  || — || September 13, 2004 || Socorro || LINEAR || H || align=right data-sort-value="0.91" | 910 m || 
|-id=704 bgcolor=#d6d6d6
| 220704 ||  || — || September 13, 2004 || Socorro || LINEAR || — || align=right | 6.6 km || 
|-id=705 bgcolor=#d6d6d6
| 220705 ||  || — || September 13, 2004 || Socorro || LINEAR || — || align=right | 5.2 km || 
|-id=706 bgcolor=#d6d6d6
| 220706 ||  || — || September 15, 2004 || Kitt Peak || Spacewatch || — || align=right | 4.2 km || 
|-id=707 bgcolor=#d6d6d6
| 220707 ||  || — || September 7, 2004 || Kitt Peak || Spacewatch || KOR || align=right | 1.8 km || 
|-id=708 bgcolor=#d6d6d6
| 220708 ||  || — || September 10, 2004 || Socorro || LINEAR || — || align=right | 4.7 km || 
|-id=709 bgcolor=#d6d6d6
| 220709 ||  || — || September 16, 2004 || Kitt Peak || Spacewatch || KOR || align=right | 1.9 km || 
|-id=710 bgcolor=#d6d6d6
| 220710 ||  || — || September 17, 2004 || Socorro || LINEAR || — || align=right | 3.5 km || 
|-id=711 bgcolor=#E9E9E9
| 220711 ||  || — || September 16, 2004 || Siding Spring || SSS || EUN || align=right | 2.5 km || 
|-id=712 bgcolor=#d6d6d6
| 220712 ||  || — || September 17, 2004 || Anderson Mesa || LONEOS || EOS || align=right | 3.2 km || 
|-id=713 bgcolor=#d6d6d6
| 220713 ||  || — || September 17, 2004 || Anderson Mesa || LONEOS || EMA || align=right | 3.9 km || 
|-id=714 bgcolor=#d6d6d6
| 220714 ||  || — || September 18, 2004 || Socorro || LINEAR || — || align=right | 3.7 km || 
|-id=715 bgcolor=#d6d6d6
| 220715 ||  || — || September 18, 2004 || Socorro || LINEAR || — || align=right | 6.7 km || 
|-id=716 bgcolor=#d6d6d6
| 220716 ||  || — || September 22, 2004 || Desert Eagle || W. K. Y. Yeung || — || align=right | 4.3 km || 
|-id=717 bgcolor=#FA8072
| 220717 ||  || — || September 21, 2004 || Socorro || LINEAR || H || align=right | 1.3 km || 
|-id=718 bgcolor=#d6d6d6
| 220718 ||  || — || September 17, 2004 || Socorro || LINEAR || EOS || align=right | 2.8 km || 
|-id=719 bgcolor=#d6d6d6
| 220719 ||  || — || September 17, 2004 || Socorro || LINEAR || — || align=right | 4.7 km || 
|-id=720 bgcolor=#d6d6d6
| 220720 ||  || — || September 17, 2004 || Socorro || LINEAR || — || align=right | 4.3 km || 
|-id=721 bgcolor=#d6d6d6
| 220721 ||  || — || September 17, 2004 || Socorro || LINEAR || — || align=right | 4.1 km || 
|-id=722 bgcolor=#d6d6d6
| 220722 ||  || — || September 17, 2004 || Socorro || LINEAR || — || align=right | 4.7 km || 
|-id=723 bgcolor=#d6d6d6
| 220723 ||  || — || September 18, 2004 || Socorro || LINEAR || NAE || align=right | 4.1 km || 
|-id=724 bgcolor=#d6d6d6
| 220724 ||  || — || September 18, 2004 || Socorro || LINEAR || EOS || align=right | 3.1 km || 
|-id=725 bgcolor=#d6d6d6
| 220725 ||  || — || September 21, 2004 || Socorro || LINEAR || EOS || align=right | 3.3 km || 
|-id=726 bgcolor=#d6d6d6
| 220726 ||  || — || September 22, 2004 || Kitt Peak || Spacewatch || — || align=right | 3.0 km || 
|-id=727 bgcolor=#d6d6d6
| 220727 ||  || — || September 17, 2004 || Socorro || LINEAR || — || align=right | 4.3 km || 
|-id=728 bgcolor=#d6d6d6
| 220728 ||  || — || September 17, 2004 || Socorro || LINEAR || — || align=right | 5.1 km || 
|-id=729 bgcolor=#d6d6d6
| 220729 ||  || — || September 22, 2004 || Socorro || LINEAR || — || align=right | 5.0 km || 
|-id=730 bgcolor=#d6d6d6
| 220730 ||  || — || September 16, 2004 || Anderson Mesa || LONEOS || — || align=right | 4.8 km || 
|-id=731 bgcolor=#d6d6d6
| 220731 ||  || — || September 23, 2004 || Socorro || LINEAR || EOS || align=right | 3.8 km || 
|-id=732 bgcolor=#d6d6d6
| 220732 || 2004 TV || — || October 4, 2004 || Kitt Peak || Spacewatch || — || align=right | 7.9 km || 
|-id=733 bgcolor=#d6d6d6
| 220733 ||  || — || October 7, 2004 || Kitt Peak || Spacewatch || — || align=right | 3.4 km || 
|-id=734 bgcolor=#d6d6d6
| 220734 ||  || — || October 9, 2004 || Socorro || LINEAR || THB || align=right | 6.5 km || 
|-id=735 bgcolor=#d6d6d6
| 220735 ||  || — || October 9, 2004 || Kitt Peak || Spacewatch || — || align=right | 4.0 km || 
|-id=736 bgcolor=#d6d6d6
| 220736 Niihama ||  ||  || October 11, 2004 || Nakagawa || H. Hori, H. Maeno || — || align=right | 5.2 km || 
|-id=737 bgcolor=#d6d6d6
| 220737 ||  || — || October 10, 2004 || Kitt Peak || Spacewatch || — || align=right | 3.5 km || 
|-id=738 bgcolor=#d6d6d6
| 220738 ||  || — || October 13, 2004 || Socorro || LINEAR || EUP || align=right | 8.8 km || 
|-id=739 bgcolor=#d6d6d6
| 220739 ||  || — || October 14, 2004 || Goodricke-Pigott || R. A. Tucker || — || align=right | 3.5 km || 
|-id=740 bgcolor=#d6d6d6
| 220740 ||  || — || October 3, 2004 || Palomar || NEAT || TRP || align=right | 3.8 km || 
|-id=741 bgcolor=#d6d6d6
| 220741 ||  || — || October 4, 2004 || Kitt Peak || Spacewatch || — || align=right | 3.7 km || 
|-id=742 bgcolor=#d6d6d6
| 220742 ||  || — || October 4, 2004 || Kitt Peak || Spacewatch || — || align=right | 3.3 km || 
|-id=743 bgcolor=#d6d6d6
| 220743 ||  || — || October 4, 2004 || Kitt Peak || Spacewatch || — || align=right | 3.3 km || 
|-id=744 bgcolor=#d6d6d6
| 220744 ||  || — || October 4, 2004 || Kitt Peak || Spacewatch || — || align=right | 4.4 km || 
|-id=745 bgcolor=#d6d6d6
| 220745 ||  || — || October 5, 2004 || Anderson Mesa || LONEOS || — || align=right | 4.8 km || 
|-id=746 bgcolor=#d6d6d6
| 220746 ||  || — || October 5, 2004 || Kitt Peak || Spacewatch || — || align=right | 3.0 km || 
|-id=747 bgcolor=#d6d6d6
| 220747 ||  || — || October 5, 2004 || Palomar || NEAT || — || align=right | 4.3 km || 
|-id=748 bgcolor=#d6d6d6
| 220748 ||  || — || October 5, 2004 || Anderson Mesa || LONEOS || — || align=right | 5.5 km || 
|-id=749 bgcolor=#d6d6d6
| 220749 ||  || — || October 5, 2004 || Anderson Mesa || LONEOS || EOS || align=right | 2.7 km || 
|-id=750 bgcolor=#d6d6d6
| 220750 ||  || — || October 5, 2004 || Powell || Powell Obs. || — || align=right | 4.7 km || 
|-id=751 bgcolor=#d6d6d6
| 220751 ||  || — || October 6, 2004 || Kitt Peak || Spacewatch || — || align=right | 2.5 km || 
|-id=752 bgcolor=#d6d6d6
| 220752 ||  || — || October 7, 2004 || Kitt Peak || Spacewatch || — || align=right | 2.6 km || 
|-id=753 bgcolor=#d6d6d6
| 220753 ||  || — || October 4, 2004 || Socorro || LINEAR || — || align=right | 5.3 km || 
|-id=754 bgcolor=#d6d6d6
| 220754 ||  || — || October 5, 2004 || Kitt Peak || Spacewatch || — || align=right | 3.2 km || 
|-id=755 bgcolor=#d6d6d6
| 220755 ||  || — || October 5, 2004 || Kitt Peak || Spacewatch || — || align=right | 4.3 km || 
|-id=756 bgcolor=#d6d6d6
| 220756 ||  || — || October 5, 2004 || Kitt Peak || Spacewatch || — || align=right | 3.3 km || 
|-id=757 bgcolor=#d6d6d6
| 220757 ||  || — || October 6, 2004 || Kitt Peak || Spacewatch || — || align=right | 2.8 km || 
|-id=758 bgcolor=#d6d6d6
| 220758 ||  || — || October 6, 2004 || Kitt Peak || Spacewatch || — || align=right | 3.1 km || 
|-id=759 bgcolor=#d6d6d6
| 220759 ||  || — || October 7, 2004 || Kitt Peak || Spacewatch || — || align=right | 3.4 km || 
|-id=760 bgcolor=#d6d6d6
| 220760 ||  || — || October 7, 2004 || Kitt Peak || Spacewatch || KOR || align=right | 1.9 km || 
|-id=761 bgcolor=#d6d6d6
| 220761 ||  || — || October 7, 2004 || Socorro || LINEAR || — || align=right | 3.7 km || 
|-id=762 bgcolor=#d6d6d6
| 220762 ||  || — || October 4, 2004 || Anderson Mesa || LONEOS || EOS || align=right | 3.3 km || 
|-id=763 bgcolor=#E9E9E9
| 220763 ||  || — || October 5, 2004 || Anderson Mesa || LONEOS || HEN || align=right | 1.9 km || 
|-id=764 bgcolor=#d6d6d6
| 220764 ||  || — || October 5, 2004 || Palomar || NEAT || — || align=right | 4.2 km || 
|-id=765 bgcolor=#d6d6d6
| 220765 ||  || — || October 6, 2004 || Palomar || NEAT || — || align=right | 4.0 km || 
|-id=766 bgcolor=#d6d6d6
| 220766 ||  || — || October 7, 2004 || Anderson Mesa || LONEOS || — || align=right | 4.0 km || 
|-id=767 bgcolor=#d6d6d6
| 220767 ||  || — || October 7, 2004 || Anderson Mesa || LONEOS || — || align=right | 3.4 km || 
|-id=768 bgcolor=#d6d6d6
| 220768 ||  || — || October 7, 2004 || Socorro || LINEAR || EOS || align=right | 2.8 km || 
|-id=769 bgcolor=#E9E9E9
| 220769 ||  || — || October 7, 2004 || Socorro || LINEAR || — || align=right | 5.5 km || 
|-id=770 bgcolor=#d6d6d6
| 220770 ||  || — || October 7, 2004 || Socorro || LINEAR || — || align=right | 2.9 km || 
|-id=771 bgcolor=#d6d6d6
| 220771 ||  || — || October 7, 2004 || Socorro || LINEAR || — || align=right | 3.7 km || 
|-id=772 bgcolor=#d6d6d6
| 220772 ||  || — || October 7, 2004 || Anderson Mesa || LONEOS || — || align=right | 4.7 km || 
|-id=773 bgcolor=#fefefe
| 220773 ||  || — || October 7, 2004 || Anderson Mesa || LONEOS || H || align=right data-sort-value="0.82" | 820 m || 
|-id=774 bgcolor=#d6d6d6
| 220774 ||  || — || October 8, 2004 || Anderson Mesa || LONEOS || — || align=right | 3.5 km || 
|-id=775 bgcolor=#d6d6d6
| 220775 ||  || — || October 8, 2004 || Anderson Mesa || LONEOS || — || align=right | 4.8 km || 
|-id=776 bgcolor=#d6d6d6
| 220776 ||  || — || October 8, 2004 || Anderson Mesa || LONEOS || EOS || align=right | 3.8 km || 
|-id=777 bgcolor=#d6d6d6
| 220777 ||  || — || October 8, 2004 || Anderson Mesa || LONEOS || VER || align=right | 5.6 km || 
|-id=778 bgcolor=#d6d6d6
| 220778 ||  || — || October 9, 2004 || Anderson Mesa || LONEOS || EOS || align=right | 2.8 km || 
|-id=779 bgcolor=#d6d6d6
| 220779 ||  || — || October 9, 2004 || Anderson Mesa || LONEOS || — || align=right | 5.1 km || 
|-id=780 bgcolor=#fefefe
| 220780 ||  || — || October 9, 2004 || Anderson Mesa || LONEOS || H || align=right data-sort-value="0.75" | 750 m || 
|-id=781 bgcolor=#d6d6d6
| 220781 ||  || — || October 4, 2004 || Kitt Peak || Spacewatch || — || align=right | 3.4 km || 
|-id=782 bgcolor=#d6d6d6
| 220782 ||  || — || October 6, 2004 || Kitt Peak || Spacewatch || — || align=right | 3.9 km || 
|-id=783 bgcolor=#d6d6d6
| 220783 ||  || — || October 7, 2004 || Kitt Peak || Spacewatch || — || align=right | 3.0 km || 
|-id=784 bgcolor=#d6d6d6
| 220784 ||  || — || October 7, 2004 || Socorro || LINEAR || — || align=right | 4.1 km || 
|-id=785 bgcolor=#d6d6d6
| 220785 ||  || — || October 7, 2004 || Socorro || LINEAR || — || align=right | 3.7 km || 
|-id=786 bgcolor=#d6d6d6
| 220786 ||  || — || October 8, 2004 || Socorro || LINEAR || EOS || align=right | 3.0 km || 
|-id=787 bgcolor=#d6d6d6
| 220787 ||  || — || October 8, 2004 || Socorro || LINEAR || — || align=right | 6.5 km || 
|-id=788 bgcolor=#d6d6d6
| 220788 ||  || — || October 9, 2004 || Socorro || LINEAR || — || align=right | 3.1 km || 
|-id=789 bgcolor=#d6d6d6
| 220789 ||  || — || October 9, 2004 || Socorro || LINEAR || HYG || align=right | 3.9 km || 
|-id=790 bgcolor=#d6d6d6
| 220790 ||  || — || October 9, 2004 || Socorro || LINEAR || EOS || align=right | 2.8 km || 
|-id=791 bgcolor=#d6d6d6
| 220791 ||  || — || October 7, 2004 || Kitt Peak || Spacewatch || EOS || align=right | 2.1 km || 
|-id=792 bgcolor=#d6d6d6
| 220792 ||  || — || October 7, 2004 || Kitt Peak || Spacewatch || KAR || align=right | 1.7 km || 
|-id=793 bgcolor=#d6d6d6
| 220793 ||  || — || October 7, 2004 || Kitt Peak || Spacewatch || — || align=right | 3.4 km || 
|-id=794 bgcolor=#d6d6d6
| 220794 ||  || — || October 7, 2004 || Kitt Peak || Spacewatch || — || align=right | 3.5 km || 
|-id=795 bgcolor=#d6d6d6
| 220795 ||  || — || October 7, 2004 || Kitt Peak || Spacewatch || KOR || align=right | 2.0 km || 
|-id=796 bgcolor=#d6d6d6
| 220796 ||  || — || October 8, 2004 || Kitt Peak || Spacewatch || — || align=right | 4.5 km || 
|-id=797 bgcolor=#d6d6d6
| 220797 ||  || — || October 15, 2004 || Goodricke-Pigott || Goodricke-Pigott Obs. || — || align=right | 3.4 km || 
|-id=798 bgcolor=#E9E9E9
| 220798 ||  || — || October 5, 2004 || Socorro || LINEAR || DOR || align=right | 5.7 km || 
|-id=799 bgcolor=#d6d6d6
| 220799 ||  || — || October 7, 2004 || Socorro || LINEAR || — || align=right | 3.9 km || 
|-id=800 bgcolor=#d6d6d6
| 220800 ||  || — || October 7, 2004 || Kitt Peak || Spacewatch || HYG || align=right | 4.0 km || 
|}

220801–220900 

|-bgcolor=#d6d6d6
| 220801 ||  || — || October 7, 2004 || Socorro || LINEAR || — || align=right | 5.4 km || 
|-id=802 bgcolor=#d6d6d6
| 220802 ||  || — || October 8, 2004 || Kitt Peak || Spacewatch || KOR || align=right | 1.9 km || 
|-id=803 bgcolor=#d6d6d6
| 220803 ||  || — || October 8, 2004 || Kitt Peak || Spacewatch || HYG || align=right | 3.7 km || 
|-id=804 bgcolor=#d6d6d6
| 220804 ||  || — || October 10, 2004 || Socorro || LINEAR || — || align=right | 5.1 km || 
|-id=805 bgcolor=#d6d6d6
| 220805 ||  || — || October 10, 2004 || Socorro || LINEAR || EOS || align=right | 3.2 km || 
|-id=806 bgcolor=#d6d6d6
| 220806 ||  || — || October 10, 2004 || Socorro || LINEAR || — || align=right | 2.9 km || 
|-id=807 bgcolor=#d6d6d6
| 220807 ||  || — || October 6, 2004 || Kitt Peak || Spacewatch || — || align=right | 3.7 km || 
|-id=808 bgcolor=#d6d6d6
| 220808 ||  || — || October 7, 2004 || Socorro || LINEAR || — || align=right | 4.5 km || 
|-id=809 bgcolor=#d6d6d6
| 220809 ||  || — || October 7, 2004 || Socorro || LINEAR || EOS || align=right | 3.4 km || 
|-id=810 bgcolor=#d6d6d6
| 220810 ||  || — || October 7, 2004 || Socorro || LINEAR || ALA || align=right | 4.6 km || 
|-id=811 bgcolor=#d6d6d6
| 220811 ||  || — || October 7, 2004 || Kitt Peak || Spacewatch || — || align=right | 5.7 km || 
|-id=812 bgcolor=#d6d6d6
| 220812 ||  || — || October 8, 2004 || Socorro || LINEAR || — || align=right | 3.8 km || 
|-id=813 bgcolor=#d6d6d6
| 220813 ||  || — || October 9, 2004 || Kitt Peak || Spacewatch || — || align=right | 3.5 km || 
|-id=814 bgcolor=#d6d6d6
| 220814 ||  || — || October 9, 2004 || Kitt Peak || Spacewatch || — || align=right | 3.2 km || 
|-id=815 bgcolor=#d6d6d6
| 220815 ||  || — || October 9, 2004 || Kitt Peak || Spacewatch || — || align=right | 5.1 km || 
|-id=816 bgcolor=#d6d6d6
| 220816 ||  || — || October 10, 2004 || Kitt Peak || Spacewatch || — || align=right | 3.2 km || 
|-id=817 bgcolor=#d6d6d6
| 220817 ||  || — || October 10, 2004 || Kitt Peak || Spacewatch || — || align=right | 3.6 km || 
|-id=818 bgcolor=#d6d6d6
| 220818 ||  || — || October 9, 2004 || Anderson Mesa || LONEOS || — || align=right | 5.6 km || 
|-id=819 bgcolor=#d6d6d6
| 220819 ||  || — || October 9, 2004 || Kitt Peak || Spacewatch || EOS || align=right | 3.4 km || 
|-id=820 bgcolor=#d6d6d6
| 220820 ||  || — || October 9, 2004 || Kitt Peak || Spacewatch || — || align=right | 3.5 km || 
|-id=821 bgcolor=#d6d6d6
| 220821 ||  || — || October 10, 2004 || Socorro || LINEAR || — || align=right | 4.8 km || 
|-id=822 bgcolor=#d6d6d6
| 220822 ||  || — || October 10, 2004 || Socorro || LINEAR || EUP || align=right | 5.2 km || 
|-id=823 bgcolor=#d6d6d6
| 220823 ||  || — || October 10, 2004 || Socorro || LINEAR || EOS || align=right | 3.3 km || 
|-id=824 bgcolor=#d6d6d6
| 220824 ||  || — || October 10, 2004 || Palomar || NEAT || EOS || align=right | 3.1 km || 
|-id=825 bgcolor=#d6d6d6
| 220825 ||  || — || October 11, 2004 || Kitt Peak || Spacewatch || — || align=right | 3.6 km || 
|-id=826 bgcolor=#d6d6d6
| 220826 ||  || — || October 13, 2004 || Anderson Mesa || LONEOS || — || align=right | 5.1 km || 
|-id=827 bgcolor=#d6d6d6
| 220827 ||  || — || October 10, 2004 || Kitt Peak || Spacewatch || — || align=right | 4.0 km || 
|-id=828 bgcolor=#d6d6d6
| 220828 ||  || — || October 13, 2004 || Kitt Peak || Spacewatch || — || align=right | 3.5 km || 
|-id=829 bgcolor=#d6d6d6
| 220829 ||  || — || October 15, 2004 || Anderson Mesa || LONEOS || — || align=right | 2.8 km || 
|-id=830 bgcolor=#E9E9E9
| 220830 ||  || — || October 4, 2004 || Kitt Peak || Spacewatch || — || align=right | 2.3 km || 
|-id=831 bgcolor=#d6d6d6
| 220831 ||  || — || October 10, 2004 || Socorro || LINEAR || — || align=right | 5.4 km || 
|-id=832 bgcolor=#d6d6d6
| 220832 ||  || — || October 10, 2004 || Socorro || LINEAR || — || align=right | 5.0 km || 
|-id=833 bgcolor=#d6d6d6
| 220833 ||  || — || October 13, 2004 || Anderson Mesa || LONEOS || URS || align=right | 5.7 km || 
|-id=834 bgcolor=#d6d6d6
| 220834 ||  || — || October 8, 2004 || Palomar || NEAT || LIX || align=right | 5.2 km || 
|-id=835 bgcolor=#d6d6d6
| 220835 ||  || — || October 16, 2004 || Socorro || LINEAR || EUP || align=right | 7.3 km || 
|-id=836 bgcolor=#d6d6d6
| 220836 ||  || — || October 21, 2004 || Socorro || LINEAR || — || align=right | 3.1 km || 
|-id=837 bgcolor=#d6d6d6
| 220837 ||  || — || October 23, 2004 || Socorro || LINEAR || — || align=right | 4.8 km || 
|-id=838 bgcolor=#d6d6d6
| 220838 ||  || — || October 23, 2004 || Socorro || LINEAR || AEG || align=right | 5.6 km || 
|-id=839 bgcolor=#FFC2E0
| 220839 || 2004 VA || — || November 1, 2004 || Anderson Mesa || LONEOS || APO +1kmPHA || align=right | 1.2 km || 
|-id=840 bgcolor=#d6d6d6
| 220840 || 2004 VQ || — || November 2, 2004 || Anderson Mesa || LONEOS || HYG || align=right | 4.2 km || 
|-id=841 bgcolor=#d6d6d6
| 220841 ||  || — || November 2, 2004 || Anderson Mesa || LONEOS || — || align=right | 6.8 km || 
|-id=842 bgcolor=#d6d6d6
| 220842 ||  || — || November 2, 2004 || Anderson Mesa || LONEOS || THM || align=right | 4.4 km || 
|-id=843 bgcolor=#d6d6d6
| 220843 ||  || — || November 3, 2004 || Kitt Peak || Spacewatch || — || align=right | 3.7 km || 
|-id=844 bgcolor=#d6d6d6
| 220844 ||  || — || November 3, 2004 || Kitt Peak || Spacewatch || — || align=right | 4.4 km || 
|-id=845 bgcolor=#d6d6d6
| 220845 ||  || — || November 3, 2004 || Kitt Peak || Spacewatch || THM || align=right | 3.4 km || 
|-id=846 bgcolor=#d6d6d6
| 220846 ||  || — || November 3, 2004 || Kitt Peak || Spacewatch || — || align=right | 3.7 km || 
|-id=847 bgcolor=#d6d6d6
| 220847 ||  || — || November 4, 2004 || Anderson Mesa || LONEOS || HYG || align=right | 4.8 km || 
|-id=848 bgcolor=#d6d6d6
| 220848 ||  || — || November 4, 2004 || Catalina || CSS || EOS || align=right | 3.4 km || 
|-id=849 bgcolor=#d6d6d6
| 220849 ||  || — || November 3, 2004 || Kitt Peak || Spacewatch || — || align=right | 3.5 km || 
|-id=850 bgcolor=#d6d6d6
| 220850 ||  || — || November 4, 2004 || Kitt Peak || Spacewatch || EMA || align=right | 6.3 km || 
|-id=851 bgcolor=#d6d6d6
| 220851 ||  || — || November 5, 2004 || Palomar || NEAT || — || align=right | 3.7 km || 
|-id=852 bgcolor=#d6d6d6
| 220852 ||  || — || November 5, 2004 || Anderson Mesa || LONEOS || — || align=right | 4.9 km || 
|-id=853 bgcolor=#d6d6d6
| 220853 ||  || — || November 5, 2004 || Palomar || NEAT || — || align=right | 4.5 km || 
|-id=854 bgcolor=#d6d6d6
| 220854 ||  || — || November 5, 2004 || Anderson Mesa || LONEOS || URS || align=right | 4.8 km || 
|-id=855 bgcolor=#d6d6d6
| 220855 ||  || — || November 5, 2004 || Palomar || NEAT || — || align=right | 4.8 km || 
|-id=856 bgcolor=#d6d6d6
| 220856 ||  || — || November 6, 2004 || Socorro || LINEAR || JLI || align=right | 6.5 km || 
|-id=857 bgcolor=#d6d6d6
| 220857 ||  || — || November 7, 2004 || Socorro || LINEAR || — || align=right | 2.9 km || 
|-id=858 bgcolor=#d6d6d6
| 220858 ||  || — || November 10, 2004 || Socorro || LINEAR || — || align=right | 3.6 km || 
|-id=859 bgcolor=#d6d6d6
| 220859 ||  || — || November 12, 2004 || Catalina || CSS || EUP || align=right | 6.1 km || 
|-id=860 bgcolor=#fefefe
| 220860 ||  || — || November 11, 2004 || Catalina || CSS || H || align=right | 1.2 km || 
|-id=861 bgcolor=#d6d6d6
| 220861 ||  || — || November 11, 2004 || Kitt Peak || Spacewatch || — || align=right | 4.3 km || 
|-id=862 bgcolor=#d6d6d6
| 220862 ||  || — || November 12, 2004 || Catalina || CSS || — || align=right | 3.5 km || 
|-id=863 bgcolor=#d6d6d6
| 220863 ||  || — || November 3, 2004 || Kitt Peak || Spacewatch || — || align=right | 5.0 km || 
|-id=864 bgcolor=#d6d6d6
| 220864 ||  || — || November 11, 2004 || Kitt Peak || Spacewatch || — || align=right | 4.4 km || 
|-id=865 bgcolor=#d6d6d6
| 220865 ||  || — || November 11, 2004 || Kitt Peak || Spacewatch || — || align=right | 2.9 km || 
|-id=866 bgcolor=#d6d6d6
| 220866 ||  || — || November 19, 2004 || Socorro || LINEAR || VER || align=right | 4.0 km || 
|-id=867 bgcolor=#d6d6d6
| 220867 ||  || — || November 18, 2004 || Campo Imperatore || CINEOS || HYG || align=right | 3.4 km || 
|-id=868 bgcolor=#d6d6d6
| 220868 ||  || — || November 30, 2004 || Palomar || NEAT || — || align=right | 6.1 km || 
|-id=869 bgcolor=#d6d6d6
| 220869 ||  || — || November 17, 2004 || Campo Imperatore || CINEOS || — || align=right | 3.8 km || 
|-id=870 bgcolor=#d6d6d6
| 220870 ||  || — || December 1, 2004 || Goodricke-Pigott || Goodricke-Pigott Obs. || — || align=right | 4.8 km || 
|-id=871 bgcolor=#d6d6d6
| 220871 ||  || — || December 8, 2004 || Socorro || LINEAR || THM || align=right | 3.7 km || 
|-id=872 bgcolor=#d6d6d6
| 220872 ||  || — || December 8, 2004 || Socorro || LINEAR || — || align=right | 4.9 km || 
|-id=873 bgcolor=#fefefe
| 220873 ||  || — || December 10, 2004 || Socorro || LINEAR || H || align=right | 1.1 km || 
|-id=874 bgcolor=#d6d6d6
| 220874 ||  || — || December 8, 2004 || Socorro || LINEAR || — || align=right | 3.8 km || 
|-id=875 bgcolor=#d6d6d6
| 220875 ||  || — || December 8, 2004 || Socorro || LINEAR || KOR || align=right | 2.5 km || 
|-id=876 bgcolor=#d6d6d6
| 220876 ||  || — || December 8, 2004 || Socorro || LINEAR || TIR || align=right | 4.9 km || 
|-id=877 bgcolor=#d6d6d6
| 220877 ||  || — || December 10, 2004 || Socorro || LINEAR || THB || align=right | 4.5 km || 
|-id=878 bgcolor=#fefefe
| 220878 ||  || — || December 10, 2004 || Socorro || LINEAR || H || align=right data-sort-value="0.79" | 790 m || 
|-id=879 bgcolor=#d6d6d6
| 220879 ||  || — || December 2, 2004 || Socorro || LINEAR || TIR || align=right | 4.8 km || 
|-id=880 bgcolor=#d6d6d6
| 220880 ||  || — || December 2, 2004 || Kitt Peak || Spacewatch || HYG || align=right | 3.9 km || 
|-id=881 bgcolor=#d6d6d6
| 220881 ||  || — || December 2, 2004 || Socorro || LINEAR || — || align=right | 4.7 km || 
|-id=882 bgcolor=#d6d6d6
| 220882 ||  || — || December 2, 2004 || Catalina || CSS || — || align=right | 4.8 km || 
|-id=883 bgcolor=#fefefe
| 220883 ||  || — || December 13, 2004 || Anderson Mesa || LONEOS || H || align=right data-sort-value="0.85" | 850 m || 
|-id=884 bgcolor=#d6d6d6
| 220884 ||  || — || December 12, 2004 || Kitt Peak || Spacewatch || — || align=right | 3.8 km || 
|-id=885 bgcolor=#d6d6d6
| 220885 ||  || — || December 11, 2004 || Socorro || LINEAR || — || align=right | 4.9 km || 
|-id=886 bgcolor=#d6d6d6
| 220886 ||  || — || December 14, 2004 || Catalina || CSS || — || align=right | 3.5 km || 
|-id=887 bgcolor=#d6d6d6
| 220887 ||  || — || December 11, 2004 || Socorro || LINEAR || — || align=right | 3.2 km || 
|-id=888 bgcolor=#d6d6d6
| 220888 ||  || — || December 10, 2004 || Kitt Peak || Spacewatch || HYG || align=right | 3.3 km || 
|-id=889 bgcolor=#d6d6d6
| 220889 ||  || — || December 10, 2004 || Socorro || LINEAR || — || align=right | 6.1 km || 
|-id=890 bgcolor=#d6d6d6
| 220890 ||  || — || December 14, 2004 || Bergisch Gladbach || W. Bickel || — || align=right | 4.2 km || 
|-id=891 bgcolor=#d6d6d6
| 220891 ||  || — || December 15, 2004 || Socorro || LINEAR || — || align=right | 4.2 km || 
|-id=892 bgcolor=#d6d6d6
| 220892 ||  || — || December 14, 2004 || Anderson Mesa || LONEOS || — || align=right | 5.0 km || 
|-id=893 bgcolor=#d6d6d6
| 220893 ||  || — || December 2, 2004 || Catalina || CSS || — || align=right | 4.8 km || 
|-id=894 bgcolor=#d6d6d6
| 220894 ||  || — || December 1, 2004 || Palomar || NEAT || — || align=right | 6.1 km || 
|-id=895 bgcolor=#d6d6d6
| 220895 ||  || — || December 16, 2004 || Catalina || CSS || — || align=right | 4.5 km || 
|-id=896 bgcolor=#FA8072
| 220896 ||  || — || December 18, 2004 || Socorro || LINEAR || H || align=right | 1.1 km || 
|-id=897 bgcolor=#d6d6d6
| 220897 ||  || — || December 16, 2004 || Anderson Mesa || LONEOS || EUP || align=right | 5.1 km || 
|-id=898 bgcolor=#d6d6d6
| 220898 ||  || — || December 19, 2004 || Socorro || LINEAR || EUP || align=right | 7.4 km || 
|-id=899 bgcolor=#d6d6d6
| 220899 ||  || — || December 18, 2004 || Mount Lemmon || Mount Lemmon Survey || THM || align=right | 3.3 km || 
|-id=900 bgcolor=#d6d6d6
| 220900 ||  || — || December 18, 2004 || Mount Lemmon || Mount Lemmon Survey || — || align=right | 3.6 km || 
|}

220901–221000 

|-bgcolor=#d6d6d6
| 220901 ||  || — || December 18, 2004 || Mount Lemmon || Mount Lemmon Survey || — || align=right | 4.1 km || 
|-id=902 bgcolor=#d6d6d6
| 220902 ||  || — || December 16, 2004 || Anderson Mesa || LONEOS || — || align=right | 3.6 km || 
|-id=903 bgcolor=#d6d6d6
| 220903 ||  || — || January 6, 2005 || Catalina || CSS || — || align=right | 5.0 km || 
|-id=904 bgcolor=#d6d6d6
| 220904 ||  || — || January 7, 2005 || Socorro || LINEAR || — || align=right | 4.6 km || 
|-id=905 bgcolor=#d6d6d6
| 220905 ||  || — || January 11, 2005 || Socorro || LINEAR || EUP || align=right | 8.6 km || 
|-id=906 bgcolor=#FA8072
| 220906 ||  || — || January 16, 2005 || Kitt Peak || Spacewatch || — || align=right data-sort-value="0.81" | 810 m || 
|-id=907 bgcolor=#d6d6d6
| 220907 ||  || — || February 2, 2005 || Socorro || LINEAR || — || align=right | 5.0 km || 
|-id=908 bgcolor=#d6d6d6
| 220908 ||  || — || February 2, 2005 || Catalina || CSS || 7:4 || align=right | 11 km || 
|-id=909 bgcolor=#FFC2E0
| 220909 ||  || — || March 2, 2005 || Socorro || LINEAR || APO +1km || align=right data-sort-value="0.83" | 830 m || 
|-id=910 bgcolor=#d6d6d6
| 220910 ||  || — || March 9, 2005 || Catalina || CSS || 3:2 || align=right | 7.4 km || 
|-id=911 bgcolor=#FA8072
| 220911 ||  || — || March 9, 2005 || Socorro || LINEAR || — || align=right | 1.5 km || 
|-id=912 bgcolor=#fefefe
| 220912 ||  || — || March 10, 2005 || Catalina || CSS || — || align=right data-sort-value="0.81" | 810 m || 
|-id=913 bgcolor=#fefefe
| 220913 ||  || — || March 10, 2005 || Mount Lemmon || Mount Lemmon Survey || — || align=right data-sort-value="0.84" | 840 m || 
|-id=914 bgcolor=#fefefe
| 220914 ||  || — || March 13, 2005 || Mount Lemmon || Mount Lemmon Survey || — || align=right data-sort-value="0.87" | 870 m || 
|-id=915 bgcolor=#fefefe
| 220915 ||  || — || March 14, 2005 || Mount Lemmon || Mount Lemmon Survey || — || align=right data-sort-value="0.81" | 810 m || 
|-id=916 bgcolor=#fefefe
| 220916 ||  || — || March 9, 2005 || Kitt Peak || Spacewatch || FLO || align=right data-sort-value="0.93" | 930 m || 
|-id=917 bgcolor=#fefefe
| 220917 ||  || — || April 1, 2005 || Kitt Peak || Spacewatch || FLO || align=right data-sort-value="0.90" | 900 m || 
|-id=918 bgcolor=#fefefe
| 220918 ||  || — || April 1, 2005 || Kitt Peak || Spacewatch || — || align=right | 1.1 km || 
|-id=919 bgcolor=#fefefe
| 220919 ||  || — || April 1, 2005 || Kitt Peak || Spacewatch || — || align=right | 1.0 km || 
|-id=920 bgcolor=#E9E9E9
| 220920 ||  || — || April 1, 2005 || Kitt Peak || Spacewatch || — || align=right | 1.0 km || 
|-id=921 bgcolor=#FA8072
| 220921 ||  || — || April 4, 2005 || Goodricke-Pigott || R. A. Tucker || — || align=right data-sort-value="0.97" | 970 m || 
|-id=922 bgcolor=#fefefe
| 220922 ||  || — || April 4, 2005 || Catalina || CSS || — || align=right | 1.2 km || 
|-id=923 bgcolor=#fefefe
| 220923 ||  || — || April 5, 2005 || Mount Lemmon || Mount Lemmon Survey || FLO || align=right data-sort-value="0.85" | 850 m || 
|-id=924 bgcolor=#fefefe
| 220924 ||  || — || April 5, 2005 || Kitt Peak || Spacewatch || — || align=right data-sort-value="0.81" | 810 m || 
|-id=925 bgcolor=#fefefe
| 220925 ||  || — || April 6, 2005 || Kitt Peak || Spacewatch || — || align=right data-sort-value="0.74" | 740 m || 
|-id=926 bgcolor=#fefefe
| 220926 ||  || — || April 6, 2005 || Kitt Peak || Spacewatch || — || align=right data-sort-value="0.73" | 730 m || 
|-id=927 bgcolor=#fefefe
| 220927 ||  || — || April 11, 2005 || Anderson Mesa || LONEOS || — || align=right data-sort-value="0.80" | 800 m || 
|-id=928 bgcolor=#fefefe
| 220928 ||  || — || April 10, 2005 || Mount Lemmon || Mount Lemmon Survey || — || align=right | 1.2 km || 
|-id=929 bgcolor=#fefefe
| 220929 ||  || — || April 4, 2005 || Catalina || CSS || — || align=right data-sort-value="0.87" | 870 m || 
|-id=930 bgcolor=#fefefe
| 220930 ||  || — || April 1, 2005 || Kitt Peak || Spacewatch || — || align=right data-sort-value="0.65" | 650 m || 
|-id=931 bgcolor=#fefefe
| 220931 || 2005 HM || — || April 16, 2005 || Kitt Peak || Spacewatch || — || align=right data-sort-value="0.94" | 940 m || 
|-id=932 bgcolor=#d6d6d6
| 220932 ||  || — || April 27, 2005 || Campo Imperatore || CINEOS || HYG || align=right | 5.1 km || 
|-id=933 bgcolor=#fefefe
| 220933 ||  || — || April 30, 2005 || Kitt Peak || Spacewatch || V || align=right data-sort-value="0.92" | 920 m || 
|-id=934 bgcolor=#fefefe
| 220934 ||  || — || May 4, 2005 || Kitt Peak || Spacewatch || ERI || align=right | 1.8 km || 
|-id=935 bgcolor=#fefefe
| 220935 ||  || — || May 6, 2005 || Catalina || CSS || — || align=right data-sort-value="0.98" | 980 m || 
|-id=936 bgcolor=#fefefe
| 220936 ||  || — || May 7, 2005 || Kitt Peak || Spacewatch || FLO || align=right data-sort-value="0.78" | 780 m || 
|-id=937 bgcolor=#fefefe
| 220937 ||  || — || May 9, 2005 || Mount Lemmon || Mount Lemmon Survey || MAS || align=right data-sort-value="0.89" | 890 m || 
|-id=938 bgcolor=#fefefe
| 220938 ||  || — || May 10, 2005 || Kitt Peak || Spacewatch || — || align=right | 1.0 km || 
|-id=939 bgcolor=#fefefe
| 220939 ||  || — || May 11, 2005 || Palomar || NEAT || — || align=right | 1.4 km || 
|-id=940 bgcolor=#fefefe
| 220940 ||  || — || May 9, 2005 || Socorro || LINEAR || EUT || align=right data-sort-value="0.92" | 920 m || 
|-id=941 bgcolor=#fefefe
| 220941 ||  || — || May 11, 2005 || Mount Lemmon || Mount Lemmon Survey || — || align=right data-sort-value="0.99" | 990 m || 
|-id=942 bgcolor=#fefefe
| 220942 ||  || — || May 9, 2005 || Mount Lemmon || Mount Lemmon Survey || — || align=right data-sort-value="0.77" | 770 m || 
|-id=943 bgcolor=#fefefe
| 220943 ||  || — || May 14, 2005 || Mount Lemmon || Mount Lemmon Survey || — || align=right | 1.1 km || 
|-id=944 bgcolor=#fefefe
| 220944 ||  || — || May 3, 2005 || Kitt Peak || Spacewatch || — || align=right | 1.1 km || 
|-id=945 bgcolor=#fefefe
| 220945 ||  || — || May 4, 2005 || Kitt Peak || Spacewatch || — || align=right data-sort-value="0.77" | 770 m || 
|-id=946 bgcolor=#fefefe
| 220946 ||  || — || May 4, 2005 || Kitt Peak || Spacewatch || — || align=right data-sort-value="0.99" | 990 m || 
|-id=947 bgcolor=#fefefe
| 220947 ||  || — || May 8, 2005 || Kitt Peak || Spacewatch || FLO || align=right data-sort-value="0.91" | 910 m || 
|-id=948 bgcolor=#fefefe
| 220948 ||  || — || May 16, 2005 || Mount Lemmon || Mount Lemmon Survey || V || align=right data-sort-value="0.78" | 780 m || 
|-id=949 bgcolor=#fefefe
| 220949 ||  || — || May 31, 2005 || Mayhill || A. Lowe || V || align=right data-sort-value="0.84" | 840 m || 
|-id=950 bgcolor=#fefefe
| 220950 ||  || — || May 31, 2005 || Anderson Mesa || LONEOS || FLO || align=right data-sort-value="0.95" | 950 m || 
|-id=951 bgcolor=#C2FFFF
| 220951 ||  || — || June 6, 2005 || Kitt Peak || Spacewatch || L4 || align=right | 12 km || 
|-id=952 bgcolor=#fefefe
| 220952 ||  || — || June 8, 2005 || Kitt Peak || Spacewatch || FLO || align=right data-sort-value="0.92" | 920 m || 
|-id=953 bgcolor=#fefefe
| 220953 ||  || — || June 8, 2005 || Kitt Peak || Spacewatch || FLO || align=right data-sort-value="0.75" | 750 m || 
|-id=954 bgcolor=#fefefe
| 220954 ||  || — || June 12, 2005 || Kitt Peak || Spacewatch || NYS || align=right data-sort-value="0.90" | 900 m || 
|-id=955 bgcolor=#fefefe
| 220955 ||  || — || June 13, 2005 || Mount Lemmon || Mount Lemmon Survey || MAS || align=right | 1.1 km || 
|-id=956 bgcolor=#fefefe
| 220956 ||  || — || June 15, 2005 || Mount Lemmon || Mount Lemmon Survey || ERI || align=right | 2.4 km || 
|-id=957 bgcolor=#fefefe
| 220957 ||  || — || June 16, 2005 || Mount Lemmon || Mount Lemmon Survey || — || align=right | 1.3 km || 
|-id=958 bgcolor=#fefefe
| 220958 ||  || — || June 27, 2005 || Kitt Peak || Spacewatch || MAS || align=right data-sort-value="0.93" | 930 m || 
|-id=959 bgcolor=#fefefe
| 220959 ||  || — || June 28, 2005 || Palomar || NEAT || NYS || align=right data-sort-value="0.92" | 920 m || 
|-id=960 bgcolor=#fefefe
| 220960 ||  || — || June 29, 2005 || Palomar || NEAT || — || align=right | 1.6 km || 
|-id=961 bgcolor=#fefefe
| 220961 ||  || — || June 28, 2005 || Palomar || NEAT || NYS || align=right data-sort-value="0.96" | 960 m || 
|-id=962 bgcolor=#fefefe
| 220962 ||  || — || June 27, 2005 || Kitt Peak || Spacewatch || NYS || align=right data-sort-value="0.98" | 980 m || 
|-id=963 bgcolor=#fefefe
| 220963 ||  || — || June 27, 2005 || Kitt Peak || Spacewatch || NYS || align=right data-sort-value="0.87" | 870 m || 
|-id=964 bgcolor=#fefefe
| 220964 ||  || — || June 29, 2005 || Kitt Peak || Spacewatch || — || align=right | 1.3 km || 
|-id=965 bgcolor=#fefefe
| 220965 ||  || — || June 29, 2005 || Kitt Peak || Spacewatch || V || align=right data-sort-value="0.77" | 770 m || 
|-id=966 bgcolor=#fefefe
| 220966 ||  || — || June 28, 2005 || Palomar || NEAT || — || align=right | 1.1 km || 
|-id=967 bgcolor=#fefefe
| 220967 ||  || — || June 29, 2005 || Kitt Peak || Spacewatch || — || align=right | 1.2 km || 
|-id=968 bgcolor=#fefefe
| 220968 ||  || — || June 29, 2005 || Palomar || NEAT || — || align=right | 1.2 km || 
|-id=969 bgcolor=#fefefe
| 220969 ||  || — || June 21, 2005 || Palomar || NEAT || — || align=right | 1.5 km || 
|-id=970 bgcolor=#fefefe
| 220970 ||  || — || June 27, 2005 || Kitt Peak || Spacewatch || — || align=right | 1.1 km || 
|-id=971 bgcolor=#fefefe
| 220971 ||  || — || June 27, 2005 || Palomar || NEAT || — || align=right | 1.1 km || 
|-id=972 bgcolor=#fefefe
| 220972 ||  || — || June 17, 2005 || Mount Lemmon || Mount Lemmon Survey || — || align=right | 1.3 km || 
|-id=973 bgcolor=#fefefe
| 220973 ||  || — || June 17, 2005 || Mount Lemmon || Mount Lemmon Survey || NYS || align=right data-sort-value="0.82" | 820 m || 
|-id=974 bgcolor=#fefefe
| 220974 ||  || — || June 17, 2005 || Mount Lemmon || Mount Lemmon Survey || NYS || align=right data-sort-value="0.87" | 870 m || 
|-id=975 bgcolor=#fefefe
| 220975 ||  || — || July 2, 2005 || Kitt Peak || Spacewatch || — || align=right data-sort-value="0.90" | 900 m || 
|-id=976 bgcolor=#fefefe
| 220976 ||  || — || July 2, 2005 || Kitt Peak || Spacewatch || NYS || align=right data-sort-value="0.81" | 810 m || 
|-id=977 bgcolor=#fefefe
| 220977 ||  || — || July 4, 2005 || Kitt Peak || Spacewatch || — || align=right | 1.1 km || 
|-id=978 bgcolor=#fefefe
| 220978 ||  || — || July 1, 2005 || Kitt Peak || Spacewatch || — || align=right | 1.9 km || 
|-id=979 bgcolor=#fefefe
| 220979 ||  || — || July 1, 2005 || Kitt Peak || Spacewatch || NYS || align=right data-sort-value="0.89" | 890 m || 
|-id=980 bgcolor=#fefefe
| 220980 ||  || — || July 2, 2005 || Catalina || CSS || — || align=right | 1.2 km || 
|-id=981 bgcolor=#fefefe
| 220981 ||  || — || July 3, 2005 || Mount Lemmon || Mount Lemmon Survey || MAS || align=right | 1.1 km || 
|-id=982 bgcolor=#fefefe
| 220982 ||  || — || July 4, 2005 || Palomar || NEAT || — || align=right | 1.1 km || 
|-id=983 bgcolor=#fefefe
| 220983 ||  || — || July 4, 2005 || Kitt Peak || Spacewatch || — || align=right data-sort-value="0.93" | 930 m || 
|-id=984 bgcolor=#fefefe
| 220984 ||  || — || July 2, 2005 || Kitt Peak || Spacewatch || MAS || align=right | 1.4 km || 
|-id=985 bgcolor=#fefefe
| 220985 ||  || — || July 5, 2005 || Palomar || NEAT || V || align=right data-sort-value="0.80" | 800 m || 
|-id=986 bgcolor=#fefefe
| 220986 ||  || — || July 5, 2005 || Palomar || NEAT || — || align=right | 1.3 km || 
|-id=987 bgcolor=#fefefe
| 220987 ||  || — || July 4, 2005 || Kitt Peak || Spacewatch || MAS || align=right | 1.0 km || 
|-id=988 bgcolor=#fefefe
| 220988 ||  || — || July 5, 2005 || Kitt Peak || Spacewatch || — || align=right | 1.2 km || 
|-id=989 bgcolor=#fefefe
| 220989 ||  || — || July 5, 2005 || Kitt Peak || Spacewatch || FLO || align=right data-sort-value="0.79" | 790 m || 
|-id=990 bgcolor=#fefefe
| 220990 ||  || — || July 5, 2005 || Kitt Peak || Spacewatch || — || align=right data-sort-value="0.99" | 990 m || 
|-id=991 bgcolor=#fefefe
| 220991 ||  || — || July 5, 2005 || Kitt Peak || Spacewatch || FLO || align=right data-sort-value="0.80" | 800 m || 
|-id=992 bgcolor=#fefefe
| 220992 ||  || — || July 4, 2005 || Siding Spring || SSS || V || align=right | 1.1 km || 
|-id=993 bgcolor=#fefefe
| 220993 ||  || — || July 6, 2005 || Siding Spring || SSS || — || align=right | 1.5 km || 
|-id=994 bgcolor=#fefefe
| 220994 ||  || — || July 8, 2005 || Kitt Peak || Spacewatch || — || align=right | 1.1 km || 
|-id=995 bgcolor=#fefefe
| 220995 ||  || — || July 10, 2005 || Kitt Peak || Spacewatch || NYS || align=right data-sort-value="0.83" | 830 m || 
|-id=996 bgcolor=#fefefe
| 220996 ||  || — || July 11, 2005 || Kitt Peak || Spacewatch || NYS || align=right data-sort-value="0.73" | 730 m || 
|-id=997 bgcolor=#fefefe
| 220997 ||  || — || July 1, 2005 || Kitt Peak || Spacewatch || NYS || align=right data-sort-value="0.93" | 930 m || 
|-id=998 bgcolor=#fefefe
| 220998 ||  || — || July 4, 2005 || Palomar || NEAT || NYS || align=right data-sort-value="0.90" | 900 m || 
|-id=999 bgcolor=#fefefe
| 220999 ||  || — || July 9, 2005 || Catalina || CSS || — || align=right | 1.4 km || 
|-id=000 bgcolor=#fefefe
| 221000 ||  || — || July 10, 2005 || Kitt Peak || Spacewatch || NYS || align=right data-sort-value="0.81" | 810 m || 
|}

References

External links 
 Discovery Circumstances: Numbered Minor Planets (220001)–(225000) (IAU Minor Planet Center)

0220